= Paraneoplastic pemphigus =

Paraneoplastic Pemphigus
- Specialty: Dermatology

Paraneoplastic pemphigus (PNP) is an autoimmune disorder stemming from an underlying tumor. It is hypothesized that antigens associated with the tumor trigger an immune response resulting in blistering of the skin and mucous membranes.

While patients with malignant tumors and benign tumors are both at risk, those with malignant tumors experience a very high mortality rates (their death rate is about 90%). Current treatment focuses on palliative care, wound healing, and administration of immunosuppressant corticosteroids; this treatment has not demonstrated a high success rate. Research currently focuses on treating the underlying tumor, in order to alleviate the symptoms of PNP.

== Signs and symptoms ==
While the presence of lesions is the denominator among patients with PNP, the characteristics of the lesions differ. The five clinical presentations of lesions associated with PNP include:

- "Pemphigus-like": Flaccid blister (discrete), crusts over the raw exuding skin lesions
- "Pemphigoid-like": Tense blister(s) on brick red erythema
- "Erythema multiforme-like": Severe polymorphic skin and/or mucous membrane lesions
- "Graft-vs.-host disease-like": Widespread lichenoid eruption with severe mucous membrane involvement
- "Lichen planus-like": Small red flat-topped scaly papules

It is most common that mucous membrane lesions of the oral cavity are presented first. They can involve the oropharynx, nasopharynx, tongue, and vermilion (red portion) of the lips. They are also known to develop in the conjunctiva of the eye, anogenital (perineum) region, and esophagus. Cutaneous lesions tend to follow the onset of mucosal lesions. The blisters often erupt in waves, usually affecting the upper trunk, head, neck, and proximal extremities. Pemphigoid-like lesions are seen more often on the extremities. Lichenoid lesions are more common among children, presenting on the trunk and limbs, ranging from small red scaly papules to extensive violet to brown papules extending to the face and neck. Within the spectrum of lichenoid presentations are wounds that have features of erythema multiforme and graft-vs.-host disease. Scaly lesions on the palms of the hand and soles of the feet have been noted to coincide with the lichenoid lesions. Lesions of varying morphology may present simultaneously and transform from one type to another as the disease progresses.

== Mechanism ==
=== Underlying cause ===
PNP is ultimately caused by the presence of a tumor. There is a strong association between the development of PNP and malignancy of the tumor. However, it is not uncommon for the tumor to be benign, as in the case of afflictions such as thymoma and Castleman's disease. Only one patient without a tumor has met the diagnostic criteria for PNP. However, they rapidly reached their demise and it is suggested they may have had an undiagnosed tumor.

=== Mechanism behind display of major symptoms ===
The underlying tumor causes circulating and tissue-bound antibodies to direct themselves against antigens in the plakin family, which are involved in the intracellular attachment structures in various levels of the skin/respiratory tract/membranes (keeping skin tissue together throughout the body). The number of target antigens varies on a case by case basis. The variability is likely what accounts for the different presentations of PNP. Through immunoprecipitation, target antigens have been found to include desmoglein-3, desmoglein-1, envoplakin, periplakin, desmoplakin 1, desmoplakin 2, and bullous pemphigoid antigen I.

The precise mechanism for how tumors are able to induce autoantibodies toward the plakin proteins is unknown. Suggested theories include tumor production of plakin proteins which initiate an autoimmune response against them, and cross-reactivity of tumor antigens and epidermal antigens.

Once the molecules that hold the various levels of the membranes together are attacked, they are unable to function properly, and the tissue breaks apart. This is manifested as the associated blistering and lesions of PNP.

== Diagnosis ==
In order to diagnose paraneoplastic pemphigus, several tests may be performed. Initially, samples are obtained via skin biopsy for routine microscopy and direct immunofluorescence (DIF) testing. The skin sample needs to be obtained from an unaffected area adjacent to a lesion. Testing in more detail follows depending on the results from the DIF. Prompt diagnosis of PNP is crucial due to the high mortality rate of the disease.

Camisa and Helm revised the original criteria from Anhalt et al. into major and minor signs indicating PNP:

Major:

- Polymorphic mucocutaneous eruption
- Concurrent internal tumor
- Serum antibodies with a specific immunoprecipitation pattern

Minor:

- Histologic evidence of acantholysis (loss of intercellular connections leading to breaking apart of the skin; lesion)
- Direct immunofluorescence showing intercellular and basement membrane staining
- Indirect immunofluorescence staining with rat bladder epithelium

=== Microscopy ===
Microscopy of the skin sample obtained from the biopsy is used to detect the presence of cleavage within the dermis, epidermal acantholysis (breaking apart of the skin), dyskeratotic keratinocytes and vacuolar changes in the layers of the skin, interfacial dermatitis, and epidermal exocytosis. Presentation of these characteristics suggests PNP.

=== Direct immunofluorescence testing ===
The presence of Immunoglobulin G, A, or M in the epidermis is normal. Detection in other locations such as intercellular and areas below the epidermis (subepidermal), as well as along the dermoepidermal junction (area that joins the epidermis and dermis), suggests paraneoplastic pemphigus.

=== Follow-up tests for confirmation ===
==== Indirect immunofluorescence (IDIF) ====
Patients with high concentration of antibodies show intercellular, intraepidermal antibodies as well as along the dermoepidermal junction. Patients with low concentration of antibodies only present with them inside the cells (intercellular).

If the results are negative, perform the additional assays regardless. Cases have been confirmed that reported with initial negative DIF and IDIF tests.

==== Assays ====
Immunoprecipitation, immunoblotting and enzyme-link immunosorbent assay (ELISA)

Poot et al. 2013 determined that immunoprecipitation for antibodies against envoplakin and periplakin or alpha2-macroglobulin-like–1 is the most sensitive test. However, alpha2-macroglobulin-like-1 can also be detected in patients with toxic epidermal necrosis.

=== Similar diseases with overlapping symptoms ===
Bullous Pemphigoid, Cicatricial Pemphigoid, Drug Eruptions. Epidermolysis Bullosa, Epidermolysis Bullosa Acquisita, Erythema Multiforme, Lichen Planus, pemphigus vulgaris, Stevens–Johnson syndrome and toxic epidermal necrolysis.

PNP is most commonly mistaken for pemphigus vulgaris, due to the extreme similarities of the lesions that develop. However, the difference lies in the specificity of the autoreactive antibodies in each case.

== Treatment ==
=== Wound healing ===
Initial treatment involves addressing any existing infections that may have occurred due to the broken state of the skin. Existing wounds are treated with warm compresses, non-adherent (non-stick) dressing, and topical antibiotic ointment. Immunosuppressive agents are administered in attempt to decrease blistering; this is not often effective. The first medication given aiming to heal the wounds are high dose corticosteroids. This is followed by steroid sparing agents which may reduce steroid intake and therefore lessen the side effects. Skin lesions are more likely to respond to this line of treatment than mucosal lesions. However, a high level of caution is advised in patients with a confirmed malignancy, where immunosuppression is vital and dictates treatment options. If the initial therapy fails to control the symptoms of PNP, and the condition of the patient deteriorates, a more aggressive approach may be necessary.

=== Medication ===
==== Prednisone ====
Prednisone is an immunosuppressive agent which affects all of the organ systems. Effects on the cellular level include cell activation, replication, differentiation, and mobility. The overall goal is to decrease blistering (inhibition of immediate and delayed hypersensitivity) through decreasing the production of autoantibodies. In order to suppress the production of antibodies, higher doses must be administered. Lesser doses can be prescribed in order to achieve suppression of monocyte function.

==== Azathioprine ====
Azathioprine is a steroid-sparing agent used in combination with Prednisone. It functions by inhibiting RNA and DNA synthesis.

==== Ciclosporin ====
Ciclosporin is an immunosuppressive agent most often used in organ transplantation that has demonstrated to be effective with skin disorders. It functions by lessening production of autoantibodies and therefore diminishing the development of blisters and erosions. The mechanism of action is by inhibiting the production of T lymphocytes and lymphokines.

==== Cyclophosphamide ====
Cyclophosphamide is an immunomodulator used in combination with systemic steroids to remove bone marrow. This is followed by transplanting peripheral blood stem cells.

== Prognosis ==
=== Quality of life/ Life expectancy ===
If the lesions are mild, the patient will be subject to a good deal of pain. If the lesions are severe, the overall quality of life is devastating. The impaired skin barrier function commonly leads to localized infection, which sepsis and death may follow. The pain from the oral and pharyngeal ulcers interfere with eating, which can compromise nutritional health.

The general prognosis for PNP is poor. It is more hopeful if the tumor is benign, but in the case of malignant tumors, the mortality rate is roughly 90%. The two most commonly associated types of tumors are non-Hodgkin lymphoma and chronic lymphocytic lymphoma; nearly all of these patients die within two years of diagnosis. This is attributed to the effects of the tumor combined with the negative side effects of the medication administered to treat PNP.

Roughly 1/3 of the deaths from PNP stem from pulmonary insufficiency which is brought about by the action of PNP on the respiratory mucosa. It manifests as dyspnea and progresses to bronchiolitis obliterans (non-reversible obstructive lung disease) via an unknown mechanism.

=== Risk factors ===
As PNP is ultimately caused by the presence of a tumor, it is not contagious. There is no known way to predict who will become afflicted with it. Patients with cancer are therefore a group at risk. Although PNP has been known to affect all age groups, it is more likely to afflict middle-aged to older patients.

== Recent research ==
The Development of ELISA testing for specific diagnosis of PNP was released in 2009. The research focuses on the specific determination of autoantibodies involved in the mechanism of PNP. Specifically, antibodies against envoplakin and periplakin were being investigated. Further use of ELISA testing on these antibodies confirmed the presence of anti-envoplakin and anti-periplakin autoantibodies in patients with PNP.

Further research in 2013 outlined the various types of assays that could be used to determine which antibodies were involved in PNP. Demonstration of certain antibodies in the serum was named as the basis for diagnosis of PNP. This piece labeled PNP as a "multiorgan disease characterized by antibodies against plakins, desmogleins and the α2-macroglobulin-like-1 (A2ML1) protein, in association with an underlying neoplasm".

A study concluded in 2009, summarized in 2010, surrounded the surgical removal of the associated tumor as a means to treat PNP. While 7/22 of the subjects perished due to resulting infection from the body's inability to heal itself after surgery, the other 15 cases survived. This study outlined the importance of early detection and prompt treatment as of utmost important in the treatment of PNP.

In 2011, a case study of a woman with ulcers on the back of her leg reported as being diagnosed with PNP. The underlying tumors are almost exclusively of B-cell lineage. However, T-cells and CD56+ Natural Killer cells have also been postulated to be associated effectors of paraneoplastic pemphigus. This case demonstrated the rare association between Natural Killer cell lymphoma and PNP, suggesting that Natural Killer cells could be involved in the pathogenesis of PNP. The article warned clinicians to be alert to the possibility that paraneoplastic pemphigus in lymphomas not of B-cell lineage. This added to the already complex, not fully understood pathogenesis of PNP.

A study in 2013 outlined the effectiveness of plasma exchange in PNP patients with benign tumors.

The University of Toronto has been working to develop a form of treatment that improves the patient's overall quality of life while remaining economically achievable. They believe they have achieved this through fixed-dose rituximab. It has proven to be effective among auto-immune diseases, but the correct administration process for treating PNP is yet to be defined. The results of the study demonstrated varying levels of remission.
