= Cumulibacter =

Scientific classification
- Domain: Bacteria
- Kingdom: Bacillati
- Phylum: Actinomycetota
- Class: Actinomycetes
- Order: Geodermatophilales
- Family: Antricoccaceae
- Genus: Cumulibacter; Huang et al. 2017

Type species
- Cumulibacter manganitolerans Huang et al. 2017

Species
- C. manganitolerans; C. soli

Genus of bacteria

Cumulibacter is a Gram-positive genus of bacteria from the family Geodermatophilaceae. Cumulibacter manganitolerans has been isolated from sludge from a manganese mine.
