= Blastococcus colisei =

Scientific classification
- Domain: Bacteria
- Kingdom: Bacillati
- Phylum: Actinomycetota
- Class: Actinomycetes
- Order: Geodermatophilales
- Family: Geodermatophilaceae
- Genus: Blastococcus
- Species: B. colisei

Binomial name
- Blastococcus colisei Hezbri et al. 2017

Type strain
- CECT 8823; DSM 46837; BMG 822

Species of bacterium

Blastococcus colisei is a Gram-positive bacterium from the genus of Blastococcus which has been isolated from limestone from the Amphitheatre of El Jem in El Jem, Tunisia.
