= Corneocyte =

Terminally differentiated keratinocytes

Corneocytes are terminally differentiated keratinocytes and compose most of the stratum corneum, the outermost layer of the epidermis. They are regularly replaced through desquamation and renewal from lower epidermal layers and are essential for its function as a skin barrier.

== Structure ==
Corneocytes are keratinocytes without nuclei and cytoplasmic organelles. They contain a highly insoluble cornified envelope within the plasma membrane, and lipids (fatty acids, sterols and ceramides) released from lamellar bodies within the epidermis. The corneocytes are interlocked with each other and organized as vertical columns of 10–30 cells to form the stratum corneum.

Corneocytes in the lower part of the stratum corneum are bridged together through specialized junctions (corneodesmosomes). Those junctions disintegrate as corneocytes migrate toward the surface of the skin and result in desquamation. At the same time, as those loosened junctions encounter more hydration, they will expand and connect together, forming potential entry pores for microorganisms.

The stratum corneum can absorb three times its weight in water, but if its water content drops below 10%, it no longer remains pliable and cracks.

== Formation ==
Corneocytes are keratinocytes in their last stage of differentiation. Keratinocytes in the stratum basale of the epidermis will multiply through cell division and migrate toward the skin surface. During that migration keratinocytes will undergo multiple stages of differentiation to finally become corneocytes once they reach the stratum corneum. As corneocytes are continually eliminated through desquamation or through rubbing, skin washing or detergents they are also continually formed through keratinocyte differentiation.

Corneocytes, also referred to as squames (from Latin squama, meaning a "thin flake" or "scales") are terminally differentiated, anucleated cells of keratinocyte lineage that constitute the majority of stratum corneum, the outermost layer of the epidermis. Size of a corneocyte is approximately 30-50 μm in diameter and 1 μm thick, and the average area of corneocytes at the surface of the skin reaches approximately 1000 μm^{2}, but may vary according to anatomical location, age and external environmental conditions such as ultraviolet (UV) irradiation. Major constituents of corneocytes are keratin intermediate filaments organized in parallel bundles to form a matrix to give rigidity to the overall structure of the skin.

== Functions ==
Layers of corneocytes produce high mechanical strength which allows epidermis of the skin to perform its function as a physical, chemical and immunological barrier. For example, corneocytes act as UV barrier by reflecting the scattered UV radiation, protecting cells inside the body from apoptosis and DNA damage. As corneocytes are essentially dead cells, they are not prone to viral attacks, though invisible microabrasions may cause permeability. Colonization of pathogens in the skin is prevented via complete turnovers of corneocyte layer every 2–4 weeks. Corneocytes are also capable of absorbing and storing small amounts of water to keep the skin hydrated and maintain its flexibility.

== Intracellular structures ==
=== Natural moisturizing factors ===
Corneocytes contain small molecules called natural moisturizing factors, which absorb small amounts of water into the corneocytes thereby hydrating the skin. The natural moisturizing factor is a collection of water-soluble compounds produced from the degradation of histidine-rich proteins called filaggrin, which are responsible for aggregating keratin filaments to form keratin bundles that maintain the rigid structure of the cells in stratum corneum. When filaggrin is degraded, urea, pyrrolidone carboxylic acid, glutamic acid and other amino acids are produced. These are collectively referred to as the natural moisturizing factor of the skin. The components of the natural moisturizing factor absorb water from the atmosphere to ensure that the superficial layers of the stratum corneum stay hydrated. As they are water-soluble themselves, excessive water contact may leach them and inhibit their normal functions which is why prolonged contact with water makes the skin drier. The intercellular lipid layer helps prevent the loss of natural moisturizing factor by sealing the outside of each corneocyte.

== Extracellular structures ==
Although stratum corneum is mostly composed of corneocytes, other supporting structures are present in the extracellular matrix to assist in the function of stratum corneum. These include:

- Lamellar bodies
- Intercellular lipids (lamellar lipid bilayer)
- Cornified envelope
- Corneodesmosomes

=== Lamellar bodies ===
Lamellar bodies are tubular or ovoid-shaped secretory organelles derived from the Golgi apparatus of keratinocytes in the upper part of stratum spinosum. From the site of production, lamellar bodies migrate to the top of the stratum granulosum and then into the intercellular domain of the stratum corneum to extrude their contents, which are predominantly lipids. The lipids ultimately form the lamellar lipid bilayer that surrounds corneocytes and also contributes to the permeability barrier homeostasis of the stratum corneum. The homeostasis function is regulated by the calcium gradient in the epidermis. Usually the calcium level is very low in stratum corneum, but high in stratum granulosum. Once the permeability barrier is disrupted an influx of water occurs in the stratum corneum, which in turn increases the calcium levels in the stratum corneum but decreases it in the stratum granulosum. This perturbation induces lamellar bodies to undergo exocytosis and secrete lipids such as glycosylceramides, cholesterol and phospholipids to retrieve the permeability barrier function of stratum corneum.

=== Intercellular lipids (lamellar lipid bilayer) ===
Corneocytes are embedded in a matrix of specialized lipids that constitute approximately 20% of the stratum corneum volume. The major constituents of the intercellular lipids in stratum corneum include ceramides (30-50% by mass), cholesterol (25% by mass) and free fatty acids (10-20% by mass), mostly produced by lamellar bodies. These hydrophobic components fuse together to form multiple bilayers of lipids between corneocytes to act as the principal barrier to the transcutaneous movement of water and electrolytes.

=== Cornified envelope ===
The cornified envelope is a protein shell that surrounds each corneocyte. Its thickness varies between 15 and 20 nm. The highly insoluble cornified envelope is formed by cross-linking of soluble precursor proteins such as loricrin, involucrin, envoplakin and periplakin.

=== Corneodesmosomes and desquamation ===
The overall integrity of the stratum corneum is maintained by specialized intercellular proteins called corneodesmosomes. Three adhesive proteins desmoglein-1, desmocollin-1 and corneodesmosin compose the corneodesmosomes and provide the cohesive forces to connect the adjacent corneocytes. The components of the corneodesmosomes are gradually degraded by the enzymes that digest proteins, as the corneocytes are pushed towards the surface of the skin. As a result of the weakened corneodesmosomes in the outer skin surface, the uppermost layers of corneocytes get exfoliated through frictional forces such as rubbing or washing. This process is a normal protective mechanism of the skin to prevent pathogens from colonizing the skin, and is referred to as desquamation. In healthy skin, desquamation is an invisible process and the stratum corneum is turned over completely within 2–4 weeks, while maintaining the tissue thickness.

== Pathologies ==
=== Dry skin (xerosis) ===
Dry skin (xerosis) involves increased thickness of stratum corneum (hyperkeratosis), which may occur due to various reasons including aging, humidity of the environment or UV irradiation. The accumulation of corneocyte clumps on the surface of the skin may lead to abnormal detachment of squames as visible clusters. Xerosis is common, especially in elderly individuals which may be due to decreased quantity of free amino acids, a constituent of natural moisturizing factor.

== Localization ==
Corneocytes are part of the stratum corneum of the epidermis and contribute to the barrier function of the skin.

== See also ==
- Skin
- Epidermis (skin)
- Keratinocyte
- Dermatopathology
