= Geodermatophilus nigrescens =

Scientific classification
- Domain: Bacteria
- Kingdom: Bacillati
- Phylum: Actinomycetota
- Class: Actinomycetia
- Order: Geodermatophilales
- Family: Geodermatophilaceae
- Genus: Geodermatophilus
- Species: G. nigrescens

Binomial name
- Geodermatophilus nigrescens Nie et al. 2012

Type strain
- CCTCC AA 2011015; DSM 45408; YIM 75980; JCM 18056

Species of bacterium

Geodermatophilus nigrescens is a bacterium from the genus Geodermatophilus which has been isolated from a dry river valley from Dongchuan in China.
