= Geodermatophilus daqingensis =

Scientific classification
- Domain: Bacteria
- Kingdom: Bacillati
- Phylum: Actinomycetota
- Class: Actinomycetia
- Order: Geodermatophilales
- Family: Geodermatophilaceae
- Genus: Geodermatophilus
- Species: G. daqingensis

Binomial name
- Geodermatophilus daqingensis Wang et al. 2017

Type strain
- CGMCC 4.7381; DSM 104001; WT-2-1

Species of bacterium

Geodermatophilus daqingensis is a Gram-positive bacterium from the genus Geodermatophilus which has been isolated from soil which was with petroleum contaminated from Daqing in China.
