= Blastococcus capsensis =

Scientific classification
- Domain: Bacteria
- Kingdom: Bacillati
- Phylum: Actinomycetota
- Class: Actinomycetes
- Order: Geodermatophilales
- Family: Geodermatophilaceae
- Genus: Blastococcus
- Species: B. capsensis

Binomial name
- Blastococcus capsensis Hezbri et al. 2016

Type strain
- BMG 804; CECT 8876; DSM 46835

Species of bacterium

Blastococcus capsensis is a Gram-positive bacterium from the genus of Blastococcus which has been isolated from a limestone rock.
