= Epidermidibacterium keratini =

Scientific classification
- Domain: Bacteria
- Kingdom: Bacillati
- Phylum: Actinomycetota
- Class: Actinomycetes
- Order: Geodermatophilales
- Family: Antricoccaceae
- Genus: Epidermidibacterium; Lee et al. 2018
- Species: E. keratini

Binomial name
- Epidermidibacterium keratini Lee et al. 2018

Type strain
- EPI-7; JCM 31644; KCCM 90264

Species of bacterium

Epidermidibacterium keratini is a Gram-positive, chemoheterotrophic, non-motile, non-sporeforming, rod-shaped, aerobic bacterium that was first isolated from human epidermal keratinocytes in 2018. It is part of the normal human flora, typically the skin flora.

== Bacteriology ==
Human skin provides a habitat for various microorganisms that stably maintain communities through commensal relationships. And skin aging is associated with changes in cutaneous physiology including interactions with a skin microbial community. This strain was first isolated from young woman. Additionally, the younger skin appeared to have high proportion of E. keratini, while the older skin had no E. keratini but rather other types of bacteria that this species has been found to be related to skin aging.

== See also ==
- List of bacterial orders
- List of bacteria genera
