= Blastococcus jejuensis =

Scientific classification
- Domain: Bacteria
- Kingdom: Bacillati
- Phylum: Actinomycetota
- Class: Actinomycetes
- Order: Geodermatophilales
- Family: Geodermatophilaceae
- Genus: Blastococcus
- Species: B. jejuensis

Binomial name
- Blastococcus jejuensis Lee 2006

Type strain
- DSM 19597; JCM 15614; KCCM 42251; KST3-10; NRRL B-24440

Species of bacterium

Blastococcus jejuensis is a bacterium from the genus of Blastococcus which has been isolated from sand from the Gwakji beach at the Jeju Island in Korea.
