= Geodermatophilus saharensis =

Scientific classification
- Domain: Bacteria
- Kingdom: Bacillati
- Phylum: Actinomycetota
- Class: Actinomycetia
- Order: Geodermatophilales
- Family: Geodermatophilaceae
- Genus: Geodermatophilus
- Species: G. saharensis

Binomial name
- Geodermatophilus saharensis Montero-Calasanz et al. 2013

Type strain
- CCUG 62813; DSM 45423; MTCC 11416; CF5/5

Species of bacterium

Geodermatophilus saharensis is a Gram-positive and aerobic bacterium from the genus Geodermatophilus which has been isolated from desert sand from Ouré Cassoni in Chad.
