= Geodermatophilus arenarius =

Scientific classification
- Domain: Bacteria
- Kingdom: Bacillati
- Phylum: Actinomycetota
- Class: Actinomycetia
- Order: Geodermatophilales
- Family: Geodermatophilaceae
- Genus: Geodermatophilus
- Species: G. arenarius

Binomial name
- Geodermatophilus arenarius Montero-Calasanz et al. 2013

Type strain
- CCUG 62763; DSM 45418; MTCC 11413; CF5/4

Species of bacterium

Geodermatophilus arenarius is a Gram-positive, aerobic and xerophilic bacterium from the genus Geodermatophilus which has been isolated from desert sand from Ouré Cassoni in Chad.
