= Geodermatophilus pulveris =

Scientific classification
- Domain: Bacteria
- Kingdom: Bacillati
- Phylum: Actinomycetota
- Class: Actinomycetia
- Order: Geodermatophilales
- Family: Geodermatophilaceae
- Genus: Geodermatophilus
- Species: G. pulveris

Binomial name
- Geodermatophilus pulveris Hezbri et al. 2016

Type strain
- CECT 9003; DSM 46839; BMG 825

Species of bacterium

Geodermatophilus pulveris is a gamma-ray resistant and aerobic bacterium from the genus Geodermatophilus which has been isolated from limestone dust from Grand Erg Oriental in Tunisia.
