= Geodermatophilus normandii =

Scientific classification
- Domain: Bacteria
- Kingdom: Bacillati
- Phylum: Actinomycetota
- Class: Actinomycetia
- Order: Geodermatophilales
- Family: Geodermatophilaceae
- Genus: Geodermatophilus
- Species: G. normandii

Binomial name
- Geodermatophilus normandii Montero-Calasanz et al. 2013

Type strain
- CCUG 62814; DSM 45417; MTCC 11412; CF5/3

Species of bacterium

Geodermatophilus normandii is a Gram-positive bacterium from the genus Geodermatophilus which has been isolated from desert sand from Ouré Cassoni in Chad.
