= Modestobacter multiseptatus =

Scientific classification
- Domain: Bacteria
- Kingdom: Bacillati
- Phylum: Actinomycetota
- Class: Actinomycetes
- Order: Geodermatophilales
- Family: Geodermatophilaceae
- Genus: Modestobacter
- Species: M. multiseptatus

Binomial name
- Modestobacter multiseptatus Mevs et al. 2000

Type strain
- CIP 106529; DSM 44406; JCM 12207; AA-826

Species of bacterium

Modestobacter multiseptatus is an aerobic bacterium from the genus Modestobacter which has been isolated from soil from the Linnaeus Terrace from the Transantarctic Mountains of Antarctica.
