= Geodermatophilus ruber =

Scientific classification
- Domain: Bacteria
- Kingdom: Bacillati
- Phylum: Actinomycetota
- Class: Actinomycetia
- Order: Geodermatophilales
- Family: Geodermatophilaceae
- Genus: Geodermatophilus
- Species: G. ruber

Binomial name
- Geodermatophilus ruber Zhang et al. 2011

Type strain
- CCM 7619; DSM 45317; JCM 17967; CPCC 201356

Species of bacterium

Geodermatophilus ruber is a bacterium from the genus Geodermatophilus which has been isolated from rhizospheric soil of the plant Astragalus membranaceus from Xining in China.
