= Geodermatophilus bullaregiensis =

Scientific classification
- Domain: Bacteria
- Kingdom: Bacillati
- Phylum: Actinomycetota
- Class: Actinomycetia
- Order: Geodermatophilales
- Family: Geodermatophilaceae
- Genus: Geodermatophilus
- Species: G. bullaregiensis

Binomial name
- Geodermatophilus bullaregiensis Hezbri et al. 2015

Type strain
- CECT 8821; DSM 46841; BMG 841

Species of bacterium

Geodermatophilus bullaregiensis is an aerobic bacterium from the genus Geodermatophilus which has been isolated from the surface of a marble monument from Bulla Regia in Tunisia.
