= PPHLN1 =

Protein-coding gene in the species Homo sapiens

Identifiers
- Aliases: PPHLN1, HSPC232, HSPC206, CR, periphilin 1
- External IDs: OMIM: 608150; MGI: 1917029; HomoloGene: 9533; GeneCards: PPHLN1; OMA:PPHLN1 - orthologs

Gene location (Human)
Chr.	Chromosome 12 (human)
Band	12q12	Start	42,238,447 bp
Band	12q12	End	42,459,715 bp

Gene location (Mouse)
Chr.	Chromosome 15 (mouse)
Band	15|15 E3	Start	93,296,231 bp
Band	15|15 E3	End	93,389,391 bp
RNA expression pattern
Bgee	Human / Mouse (ortholog); Top expressed in: pancreatic ductal cell; oocyte; secondary oocyte; germinal epithelium; mucosa of paranasal sinus; palpebral conjunctiva; Achilles tendon; Brodmann area 23; epithelium of nasopharynx; gingival epithelium / Top expressed in: tail of embryo; genital tubercle; zygote; spermatid; hand; epiblast; seminiferous tubule; primitive streak; secondary oocyte; embryo; More reference expression data
BioGPS	n/a
Gene ontology
Molecular function	protein binding; RNA binding
Cellular component	Golgi apparatus; nucleus; nucleoplasm; chromosome; cytoplasm; cytosol
Biological process	keratinization; regulation of transcription, DNA-templated; transcription, DNA-templated; negative regulation of gene expression, epigenetic; negative regulation of transcription, DNA-templated; positive regulation of DNA methylation-dependent heterochromatin assembly; protein localization to heterochromatin
Sources:Amigo / QuickGO
Orthologs
Species	Human	Mouse
Entrez	51535	223828
Ensembl	ENSG00000134283	ENSMUSG00000036167
UniProt	Q8NEY8	Q8K2H1
RefSeq (mRNA)	NM_001143787; NM_001143788; NM_001143789; NM_016488; NM_201438 NM_201439; NM_201440; NM_201515; NM_001364822; NM_001364823; NM_001364824; NM_001364825; NM_001364826; NM_001364827; NM_001364828; NM_001364829; NM_001364830; NM_001364831; NM_001364832; NM_001364833; NM_001364834	NM_001083114; NM_001285863; NM_001285864; NM_146062; NM_175363 NM_001358748; NM_001358749; NM_001358750
RefSeq (protein)	NP_001137259; NP_001137260; NP_001137261; NP_057572; NP_958846 NP_958847; NP_958848; NP_958923; NP_001351751; NP_001351752; NP_001351753; NP_001351754; NP_001351755; NP_001351756; NP_001351757; NP_001351758; NP_001351759; NP_001351760; NP_001351761; NP_001351762; NP_001351763	NP_001076583; NP_001272792; NP_001272793; NP_666174; NP_780572 NP_001345677; NP_001345678; NP_001345679
Location (UCSC)	Chr 12: 42.24 – 42.46 Mb	Chr 15: 93.3 – 93.39 Mb
PubMed search
- Wikidata
View/Edit Human	View/Edit Mouse

Periphilin-1 is a protein that in humans is encoded by the PPHLN1 gene.

The protein encoded by this gene is one of the several proteins that become sequentially incorporated into the cornified cell envelope during the terminal differentiation of keratinocyte at the outer layers of epidermis.

This protein interacts with periplakin, which is known as a precursor of the cornified cell envelope. The cellular localization pattern and insolubility of this protein suggest that it may play a role in epithelial differentiation and contribute to epidermal integrity and barrier formation. Multiple alternatively spliced transcript variants encoding distinct isoforms have been observed.
