= Geodermatophilus tzadiensis =

Scientific classification
- Domain: Bacteria
- Kingdom: Bacillati
- Phylum: Actinomycetota
- Class: Actinomycetia
- Order: Geodermatophilales
- Family: Geodermatophilaceae
- Genus: Geodermatophilus
- Species: G. tzadiensis

Binomial name
- Geodermatophilus tzadiensis Montero-Calasanz et al. 2013

Type strain
- DSM 45416; DSM 45415; MTCC 11411; CF 5/2; CF 7/1

Species of bacterium

Geodermatophilus tzadiensis is a Gram-positive, aerobic and UV radiation-resistant bacterium from the genus Geodermatophilus which has been isolated from desert sand near Ouré Cassoni in Chad.
