= Plakin =

Protein family

A plakin is a protein that associates with junctional complexes and the cytoskeleton.

Types include desmoplakin, envoplakin, periplakin, plectin, bullous pemphigoid antigen 1, corneodesmosin, and microtubule actin cross-linking factor.
