= Geodermatophilus dictyosporus =

Scientific classification
- Domain: Bacteria
- Kingdom: Bacillati
- Phylum: Actinomycetota
- Class: Actinomycetia
- Order: Geodermatophilales
- Family: Geodermatophilaceae
- Genus: Geodermatophilus
- Species: G. dictyosporus

Binomial name
- Geodermatophilus dictyosporus Montero-Calasanz et al. 2015

Type strain
- ATCC 25080; CBS 234.69; CCUG 62970; DSM 43161

Synonyms
- "Geodermatophilus obscurus subsp. dictyosporus" Luedemann 1968

Species of bacterium

Geodermatophilus dictyosporus is a Gram-positive and gamma-ray resistant bacterium from the genus Geodermatophilus which has been isolated from soil from the Westgard Pass in the United States.
