= Geodermatophilus aquaeductus =

Scientific classification
- Domain: Bacteria
- Kingdom: Bacillati
- Phylum: Actinomycetota
- Class: Actinomycetia
- Order: Geodermatophilales
- Family: Geodermatophilaceae
- Genus: Geodermatophilus
- Species: G. aquaeductus

Binomial name
- Geodermatophilus aquaeductus Hezbri et al. 2015

Type strain
- CECT 8822; DSM 46834; BMG 801

Species of bacterium

Geodermatophilus aquaeductus is a Gram-positive, aerobic and gamma-ray resistant bacterium from the genus Geodermatophilus which has been isolated from the surface of a calcarenite stone from the ruins of the Aqueduct of Hadrian in Tunisia.
