= Blastococcus saxobsidens =

Scientific classification
- Domain: Bacteria
- Kingdom: Bacillati
- Phylum: Actinomycetota
- Class: Actinomycetes
- Order: Geodermatophilales
- Family: Geodermatophilaceae
- Genus: Blastococcus
- Species: B. saxobsidens

Binomial name
- Blastococcus saxobsidens Urzì et al. 2004

Type strain
- BC444; DSM 44509; JCM 13239; NRRL B-24246

Species of bacterium

Blastococcus saxobsidens is a Gram-positive and aerobic bacterium from the genus of Blastococcus which has been isolated from calcarenite in Malta.
