= Blastococcus xanthinilyticus =

Scientific classification
- Domain: Bacteria
- Kingdom: Bacillati
- Phylum: Actinomycetota
- Class: Actinomycetes
- Order: Geodermatophilales
- Family: Geodermatophilaceae
- Genus: Blastococcus
- Species: B. xanthinilyticus

Binomial name
- Blastococcus xanthinilyticus Hezbri et al. 2018

Type strain
- CECT 8884; DSM 46842; BMG 862

Species of bacterium

Blastococcus xanthinilyticus is a Gram-positive and non-motile bacterium from the genus of Blastococcus which has been isolated from marble dust from the Bulla Regia monument in Tunisia.
