= Geodermatophilus africanus =

Scientific classification
- Domain: Bacteria
- Kingdom: Bacillati
- Phylum: Actinomycetota
- Class: Actinomycetia
- Order: Geodermatophilales
- Family: Geodermatophilaceae
- Genus: Geodermatophilus
- Species: G. africanus

Binomial name
- Geodermatophilus africanus Montero-Calasanz et al. 2013

Type strain
- CCUG 62969; DSM 45422; MTCC 11556; CF11/1

Species of bacterium

Geodermatophilus africanus is a Gram-positive, aerobic and halotolerant bacterium from the genus Geodermatophilus which has been isolated from desert sand near Ourba in the Sahara.
