= Geodermatophilus siccatus =

Scientific classification
- Domain: Bacteria
- Kingdom: Bacillati
- Phylum: Actinomycetota
- Class: Actinomycetia
- Order: Geodermatophilales
- Family: Geodermatophilaceae
- Genus: Geodermatophilus
- Species: G. siccatus

Binomial name
- Geodermatophilus siccatus Montero-Calasanz et al. 2013

Type strain
- CCUG 62765; DSM 45419; MTCC 11414; CF6/1

Species of bacterium

Geodermatophilus siccatus is a Gram-positive and aerobic bacterium from the genus Geodermatophilus which has been isolated from arid sand near Ourba in Chad.
