= Geodermatophilus amargosae =

Scientific classification
- Domain: Bacteria
- Kingdom: Bacillati
- Phylum: Actinomycetota
- Class: Actinomycetia
- Order: Geodermatophilales
- Family: Geodermatophilaceae
- Genus: Geodermatophilus
- Species: G. amargosae

Binomial name
- Geodermatophilus amargosae del Carmen Montero et al. 2014

Type strain
- ATCC 25081; CCUG 62971; DSM 46136

Synonyms
- "Geodermatophilus obscurus subsp. amargosae" Luedemann 1968

Species of bacterium

Geodermatophilus amargosae is a Gram-positive and aerobic bacterium from the genus Geodermatophilus which has been isolated from desert soil from the Amargosa Desert in the United States.
