= Geodermatophilus poikilotrophus =

Scientific classification
- Domain: Bacteria
- Kingdom: Bacillati
- Phylum: Actinomycetota
- Class: Actinomycetes
- Order: Geodermatophilales
- Family: Geodermatophilaceae
- Genus: Geodermatophilus
- Species: G. poikilotrophus

Binomial name
- Geodermatophilus poikilotrophus corrig. Montero-Calasanz et al. 2015

Type strain
- CCUG 63018; DSM 44209; G18

Synonyms
- Geodermatophilus poikilotrophi Montero-Calasanz et al. 2015

Species of bacterium

Geodermatophilus poikilotrophus is a Gram-positive and aerobic bacterium from the genus Geodermatophilus which has been isolated from dolomitic marble from Samara in Namibia.
