= Geodermatophilus telluris =

Scientific classification
- Domain: Bacteria
- Kingdom: Bacillati
- Phylum: Actinomycetota
- Class: Actinomycetia
- Order: Geodermatophilales
- Family: Geodermatophilaceae
- Genus: Geodermatophilus
- Species: G. telluris

Binomial name
- Geodermatophilus telluris Montero-Calasanz et al. 2013

Type strain
- CCUG 62764; DSM 45421; CF9/1/1

Species of bacterium

Geodermatophilus telluris is a Gram-positive and aerobic bacterium from the genus Geodermatophilus which has been isolated from arid sand near Vers Ourba in Chad.
