= Blastococcus =

Scientific classification
- Domain: Bacteria
- Kingdom: Bacillati
- Phylum: Actinomycetota
- Class: Actinomycetes
- Order: Geodermatophilales
- Family: Geodermatophilaceae
- Genus: Blastococcus; Ahrens & Moll 1970 (Approved Lists 1980)

Type species
- Blastococcus aggregatus Ahrens & Moll 1970

Species
- See text

Genus of bacteria

Blastococcus is a Gram-positive, coccoid and aerobic genus of bacteria from the family of Geodermatophilaceae.

== Phylogeny ==
The currently accepted taxonomy is based on the List of Prokaryotic names with Standing in Nomenclature (LPSN) and National Center for Biotechnology Information (NCBI).

16S rRNA based LTP_10_2024

- - - Blastococcus~
      - Blastococcus carthaginiensis Kammoun et al. 2023
      - - - Blastococcus atacamensis Castro et al. 2018
          - Blastococcus saxobsidens Urzì et al. 2004
        - - Blastococcus endophyticus Zhu et al. 2013
          - - Blastococcus capsensis Hezbri et al. 2016
            - Blastococcus xanthinilyticus Hezbri et al. 2018
  - - - Blastococcus
        - - B. aurantiacus Montero-Calasanz et al. 2023
          - - B. aggregatus Ahrens and Moll 1970
            - B. fimeti Montero-Calasanz et al. 2023
        - - B. colisei Hezbri et al. 2017
          - - B. tunisiensis Louati et al. 2022
            - - B. haudaquaticus Montero-Calasanz et al. 2023
              - - B. jejuensis Lee 2006
                - - B. mobilis Montero-Calasanz et al. 2023
                  - - B. deserti Yang et al. 2019
                    - B. litoris Lee et al. 2018
    - other

120 marker proteins based GTDB 10-RS226

- Blastococcus
  - B. jejuensis
  - - - B. mobilis
      - - B. litoris
        - - B. haudaquaticus
          - - B. colisei
            - - B. brunescens Hezbri et al. 2024
              - B. tunisiensis
    - - - "Ca. B. massiliensis" Pfleiderer et al. 2013
        - - B. aurantiacus
          - - B. aggregatus
            - B. fimeti
      - - - B. atacamensis
          - B. saxobsidens
        - - B. carthaginiensis Kammoun et al. 2023
          - - B. capsensis
            - B. xanthinilyticus

Species incertae sedis:

- B. goldschmidtiae Nouioui et al. 2025

== See also ==
- List of bacterial orders
- List of bacteria genera
