= Geodermatophilus =

Scientific classification
- Domain: Bacteria
- Kingdom: Bacillati
- Phylum: Actinomycetota
- Class: Actinomycetes
- Order: Geodermatophilales
- Family: Geodermatophilaceae
- Genus: Geodermatophilus; Luedemann 1968 (Approved Lists 1980)

Type species
- Geodermatophilus obscurus Luedemann 1968

Species
- See text

Synonyms
- Trujillonella Montero-Calasanz et al. 2023

Genus of bacteria

Geodermatophilus is a Gram-positive genus of bacteria from the phylum Actinomycetota.

== Phylogeny ==
The currently accepted taxonomy is based on the List of Prokaryotic names with Standing in Nomenclature (LPSN) and National Center for Biotechnology Information (NCBI).

16S rRNA based LTP_10_2024

- Geodermatophilus
  - G. sabuli Hezbri et al. 2015
  - - G. ruber Zhang et al. 2011
    - - G. pulveris Hezbri et al. 2016
      - - - G. chilensis Castro et al. 2020
          - G. marinus Li et al. 2019
        - - G. siccatus Montero-Calasanz et al. 2013
          - - G. obscurus Luedemann 1968
            - - G. poikilotrophus corrig. Montero-Calasanz et al. 2015
              - - G. africanus Montero-Calasanz et al. 2013
                - - - G. telluris Montero-Calasanz et al. 2013
                    - G. tzadiensis Montero-Calasanz et al. 2013
                  - - - G. bullaregiensis Hezbri et al. 2015
                      - G. dictyosporus Montero-Calasanz et al. 2015
                    - - G. normandii Montero-Calasanz et al. 2013
                      - - - G. daqingensis Wang et al. 2017
                          - G. saharensis Montero-Calasanz et al. 2013
                        - - - G. amargosae Montero-Calasanz et al. 2014
                            - G. aquaeductus Hezbri et al. 2015
                          - - G. arenarius Montero-Calasanz et al. 2013
                            - G. nigrescens Nie et al. 2012

120 marker proteins based GTDB 10-RS226

- Geodermatophilus
  - Trujillonella endophytica (Zhu et al. 2013) Montero-Calasanz et al. 2023
  - - G. sabuli
    - - G. ruber
      - - - G. pulveris
          - - - G. obscurus
              - G. poikilotrophus
            - - G. chilensis
              - - G. africanus
                - G. siccatus
        - - G. bullaregiensis
          - - - G. telluris
              - - G. dictyosporus
                - G. tzadiensis
            - - - G. nigrescens
                - G. saharensis
              - - G. normandii
                - - G. aquaeductus
                  - G. amargosae

== See also ==
- List of bacterial orders
- List of bacteria genera
