= Modestobacter =

Scientific classification
- Domain: Bacteria
- Kingdom: Bacillati
- Phylum: Actinomycetota
- Class: Actinomycetes
- Order: Geodermatophilales
- Family: Geodermatophilaceae
- Genus: Modestobacter; Mevs et al. 2000

Type species
- Modestobacter multiseptatus Mevs et al. 2000

Species
- See text

Genus of bacteria

Modestobacter is a Gram-positive genus of bacteria from the phylum Actinomycetota.

== Phylogeny ==
The currently accepted taxonomy is based on the List of Prokaryotic names with Standing in Nomenclature (LPSN) and National Center for Biotechnology Information (NCBI).

16S rRNA based LTP_10_2024

- Modestobacter
  - M. lapidis Trujillo et al. 2015
  - - M. multiseptatus Mevs et al. 2000
    - - M. versicolor Reddy et al. 2007
      - - M. muralis Trujillo et al. 2015
        - - - M. italicus Montero-Calasanz et al. 2019
            - - M. altitudinis Golińska et al. 2020
              - M. excelsi Golinska et al. 2021
          - - - M. caceresii Busarakam et al. 2017
              - M. lacusdianchii Zhang et al. 2018
            - - M. marinus Xiao et al. 2011
              - M. roseus Qin et al. 2013

120 marker proteins based GTDB 10-RS226

- Modestobacter
  - M. lapidis
  - - M. roseus
    - - - M. muralis
        - - M. caceresii
          - M. marinus
      - - M. versicolor
        - - M. italicus
          - - M. altitudinis
            - M. excelsi

== See also ==
- List of bacterial orders
- List of bacteria genera
