= Blastococcus endophyticus =

Scientific classification
- Domain: Bacteria
- Kingdom: Bacillati
- Phylum: Actinomycetota
- Class: Actinomycetes
- Order: Geodermatophilales
- Family: Geodermatophilaceae
- Genus: Blastococcus
- Species: B. endophyticus

Binomial name
- Blastococcus endophyticus Zhu et al. 2013

Type strain
- CCTCC AA 209045; DSM 45413; KCTC 19998; YIM 68236

Species of bacterium

Blastococcus endophyticus is a bacterium from the genus of Blastococcus which has been isolated from the leaves of the plant Camptotheca acuminata from Yunnan in China.
