= Relapsing linear acantholytic dermatosis =

- Specialty: Dermatology

Relapsing linear acantholytic dermatosis is a cutaneous condition characterized by relapsing linear erosions and crusting, histologically identical to Hailey–Hailey disease. It is not to be confused with transient acantholytic dermatosis.

== See also ==
- Linear porokeratosis
- List of cutaneous conditions
