= A2ML1 =

Protein-coding gene in humans

Identifiers
- Aliases: A2ML1, CPAMD9, alpha-2-macroglobulin like 1, p170, OMS
- External IDs: OMIM: 610627; GeneCards: A2ML1

Gene location (Human)
Chr.	Chromosome 12 (human)
Band	12p13.31	Start	8,822,621 bp
Band	12p13.31	End	8,887,001 bp
RNA expression pattern
Bgee	Human / Mouse (ortholog); Top expressed in: gums; gingival epithelium; mucosa of pharynx; oral cavity; body of tongue; human penis; skin of abdomen; skin of leg; buccal mucosa cell; vulva / n/a; More reference expression data
BioGPS	n/a
Gene ontology
Molecular function	serine-type endopeptidase inhibitor activity; endopeptidase inhibitor activity; peptidase inhibitor activity
Cellular component	extracellular region; extracellular exosome; extracellular space
Biological process	negative regulation of endopeptidase activity; negative regulation of peptidase activity; regulation of endopeptidase activity
Sources:Amigo / QuickGO
Orthologs
Databases	NCBI: entry; OMA: entry
Species	Human	Mouse
Entrez	144568	n/a
Ensembl	ENSG00000166535	n/a
UniProt	A8K2U0; H0YGG5	n/a
RefSeq (mRNA)	NM_001282424; NM_144670	n/a
RefSeq (protein)	NP_001269353; NP_653271	n/a
Location (UCSC)	Chr 12: 8.82 – 8.89 Mb	n/a
PubMed search		n/a
- Wikidata
View/Edit Human

Alpha-2-macroglobulin-like 1 abbreviated as α2ML1 is a protein that in humans is encoded by the A2ML1 gene. α2ML1 is a large, 180 kDa protein found in the epidermis. It is able to the inhibit the chymotryptic activity of KLK7.

== Function ==
This gene encodes a member of the alpha-macroglobulin superfamily. The encoded protein acts as an inhibitor for several proteases, and has been reported as the p170 antigen recognized by autoantibodies in the autoimmune disease paraneoplastic pemphigus (PNP). Alternative splicing results in multiple transcript variants.

== Clinical significance ==
Mutations in A2ML1 are associated to Noonan-like syndrome.
