= Keratinocyte =

Primary type of cell found in the epidermis

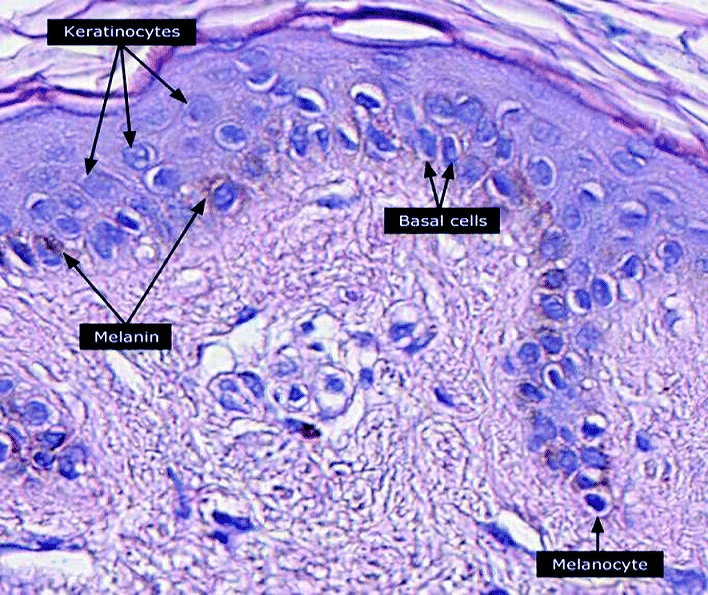
Micrograph of keratinocytes, basal cells and melanocytes in the epidermis

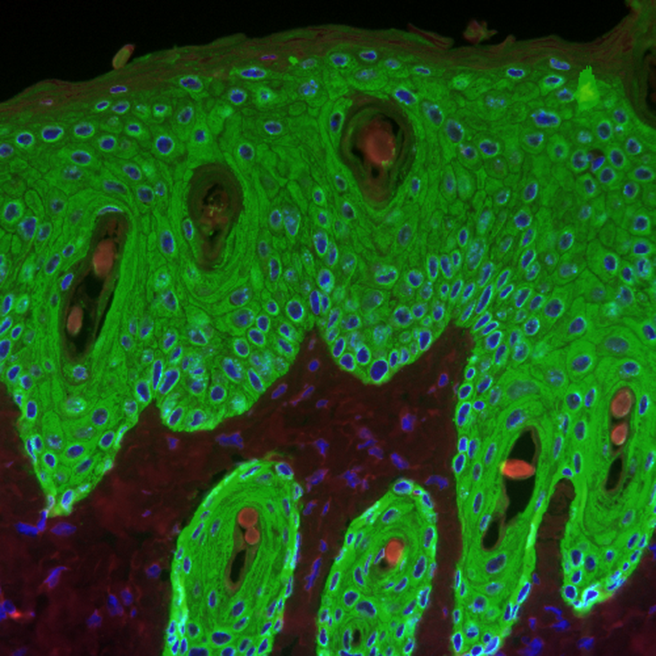
Keratinocytes (stained green) in the skin of a mouse

Keratinocytes are the primary type of cell found in the epidermis, the outermost layer of the skin. In humans, they constitute 90% of epidermal skin cells. Basal cells in the basal layer (stratum basale) of the skin are sometimes referred to as basal keratinocytes.

Keratinocytes form a barrier against environmental damage by heat, UV radiation, water loss, pathogenic bacteria, fungi, parasites, and viruses. A number of structural proteins, enzymes, lipids, and antimicrobial peptides contribute to maintain the important barrier function of the skin. Keratinocytes differentiate from epidermal stem cells in the lower part of the epidermis and migrate towards the surface, finally becoming corneocytes and eventually being shed, which happens every 40 to 56 days in humans.

== Function ==
The primary function of keratinocytes is to act as a barrier. They protect the body from environmental damage by heat, UV radiation, dehydration, pathogenic bacteria, fungi, parasites, and viruses.

Pathogens invading the upper layers of the epidermis can cause keratinocytes to produce proinflammatory mediators, particularly chemokines such as CXCL10 and CCL2 (MCP-1) which attract monocytes, natural killer cells, T-lymphocytes, and dendritic cells to the site of pathogen invasion.

== Structure ==
A number of structural proteins (filaggrin, keratin), enzymes (e.g. proteases), lipids, and antimicrobial peptides (defensins) contribute to maintain the important barrier function of the skin. Keratinization is part of the physical barrier formation (cornification), in which the keratinocytes produce more and more keratin and undergo terminal differentiation. The fully cornified keratinocytes that form the outermost layer are constantly shed off and replaced by new cells.

== Cell differentiation ==
Epidermal stem cells reside in the lower part of the epidermis (stratum basale) and are attached to the basement membrane through hemidesmosomes. Epidermal stem cells divide in a random manner yielding either more stem cells or transit amplifying cells. Some of the transit amplifying cells continue to proliferate then commit to differentiate and migrate towards the surface of the epidermis. Those stem cells and their differentiated progeny are organized into columns named epidermal proliferation units.

During this differentiation process, keratinocytes permanently withdraw from the cell cycle, initiate expression of epidermal differentiation markers, and move suprabasally as they become part of the stratum spinosum, stratum granulosum, and eventually corneocytes in the stratum corneum. Corneocytes are keratinocytes that have completed their differentiation program and have lost their nucleus and cytoplasmic organelles. Corneocytes will eventually be shed off through desquamation as new ones come in. At each stage of differentiation, keratinocytes express specific keratins, such as keratin 1, keratin 5, keratin 10, and keratin 14, but also other markers such as involucrin, loricrin, transglutaminase, filaggrin, and caspase 14. In humans, it is estimated that keratinocytes turn over from stem cells to desquamation every 40–56 days, whereas in mice the estimated turnover time is 8–10 days.

Factors promoting keratinocyte differentiation are:

- A calcium gradient, with the lowest concentration in the stratum basale and increasing concentrations until the outer stratum granulosum, where it reaches its maximum. Calcium concentration in the stratum corneum is very high in part because those relatively dry cells are not able to dissolve the ions. Those elevations of extracellular calcium concentrations induces an increase in intracellular free calcium concentrations in keratinocytes. Part of that intracellular calcium increase comes from calcium released from intracellular stores and another part comes from transmembrane calcium influx, through both calcium-sensitive chloride channels and voltage-independent cation channels permeable to calcium. Moreover, it has been suggested that an extracellular calcium-sensing receptor (CaSR) also contributes to the rise in intracellular calcium concentration.
- Vitamin D_{3} (cholecalciferol) regulates keratinocyte proliferation and differentiation mostly by modulating calcium concentrations and regulating the expression of genes involved in keratinocyte differentiation. Keratinocytes are the only cells in the body with the entire vitamin D metabolic pathway from vitamin D production to catabolism and vitamin D receptor expression.
- Cathepsin E.
- TALE homeodomain transcription factors.
- Hydrocortisone.

Since keratinocyte differentiation inhibits keratinocyte proliferation, factors that promote keratinocyte proliferation should be considered as preventing differentiation. These factors include:

- The transcription factor p63, which prevents epidermal stem cells from differentiating into keratinocytes. Mutations in the p63 DNA-binding domain are associated with ectrodactyly, ectodermal dysplasia, and cleft lip/palate (EEC) syndrome. The transcriptome of p63 mutant keratinocytes deviated from the normal epidermal cell identity.
- Vitamin A and its analogues.
- Epidermal growth factor.
- Transforming growth factor alpha.
- Cholera toxin.

== Interaction with other cells ==
Within the epidermis keratinocytes are associated with other cell types such as melanocytes and Langerhans cells. Keratinocytes form tight junctions with the nerves of the skin and hold the Langerhans cells and intra-dermal lymphocytes in position within the epidermis. Keratinocytes also modulate the immune system: apart from the above-mentioned antimicrobial peptides and chemokines they are also potent producers of anti-inflammatory mediators such as IL-10 and TGF-β. When activated, they can stimulate cutaneous inflammation and Langerhans cell activation via TNFα and IL-1β secretion.

Keratinocytes contribute to protecting the body from ultraviolet radiation (UVR) by taking up melanosomes, vesicles containing the endogenous photoprotectant melanin, from epidermal melanocytes. Each melanocyte in the epidermis has several dendrites that stretch out to connect it with many keratinocytes. The melanin is then stored within keratinocytes and melanocytes in the perinuclear area as supranuclear "caps", where it protects the DNA from UVR-induced damage.

== Role in wound healing ==
Wounds to the skin will be repaired in part by the migration of keratinocytes to fill in the gap created by the wound. The first set of keratinocytes to participate in that repair come from the bulge region of the hair follicle and will only survive transiently. Within the healed epidermis they will be replaced by keratinocytes originating from the epidermis. At the opposite, epidermal keratinocytes, can contribute to de novo hair follicle formation during the healing of large wounds. Functional keratinocytes are needed for tympanic perforation healing.

A 2026 phase I clinical trial involving five patients reported that allogeneic cultured keratinocyte sheets were feasible and caused no serious adverse events when used to treat deep second-degree burns.

== Sunburn cells ==
A sunburn cell is a keratinocyte with a pyknotic nucleus and eosinophilic cytoplasm that appears after exposure to UVC or UVB radiation or UVA in the presence of psoralens. It shows premature and abnormal keratinization, and has been described as an example of apoptosis.

== Aging ==
With age, tissue homeostasis declines partly because stem/progenitor cells fail to self-renew or differentiate. DNA damage caused by exposure of stem/progenitor cells to reactive oxygen species (ROS) may play a key role in epidermal stem cell aging. Mitochondrial superoxide dismutase (SOD2) ordinarily protects against ROS. Loss of SOD2 in mouse epidermal cells was observed to cause cellular senescence that irreversibly arrested proliferation in a fraction of keratinocytes. In older mice, SOD2 deficiency delayed wound closure and reduced epidermal thickness.

== Civatte body ==
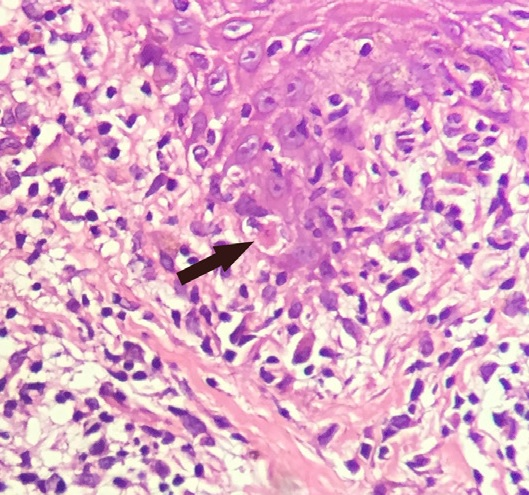
Civatte body

A Civatte body (named after the French dermatologist Achille Civatte, 1877–1956) is a damaged basal keratinocyte that has undergone apoptosis, and consist largely of keratin intermediate filaments, and are almost invariably covered with immunoglobulins, mainly IgM. Civatte bodies are characteristically found in skin lesions of various dermatoses, particularly lichen planus and discoid lupus erythematosus. They may also be found in graft-versus-host disease, adverse drug reactions, inflammatory keratosis (such as lichenoid actinic keratosis and lichen planus-like keratosis), erythema multiforme, bullous pemphigoid, eczema, lichen planopilaris, febrile neutrophilic dermatosis, toxic epidermal necrolysis, herpes simplex and varicella zoster lesions, dermatitis herpetiformis, porphyria cutanea tarda, sarcoidosis, subcorneal pustular dermatosis, transient acantholytic dermatosis and epidermolytic hyperkeratosis.

== See also ==
- Epidermis
- Skin
- Corneocyte
- Keratin
- HaCaT
- List of human cell types derived from the germ layers
- Epidermidibacterium keratini
- List of distinct cell types in the adult human body
