= Dystonin =

Neurologically significant human protein

DST
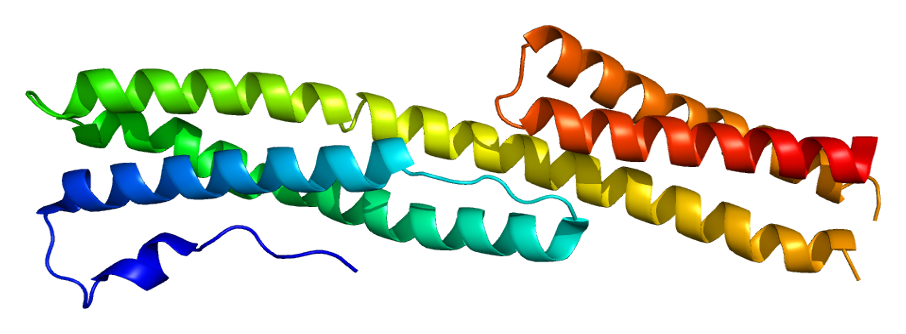

Identifiers
- Aliases: DST, BPA, BPAG1, CATX-15, CATX15, D6S1101, DMH, DT, EBSB2, HSAN6, MACF2, dystonin, BP230, BP240, EBS3
- External IDs: OMIM: 113810; GeneCards: DST
Available structures
PDB	Human UniProt search: PDBe RCSB
PDB	List of PDB id codes 3GJO

Gene location (Human)
Chr.	Chromosome 6 (human)
Band	6p12.1	Start	56,457,987 bp
Band	6p12.1	End	56,954,830 bp
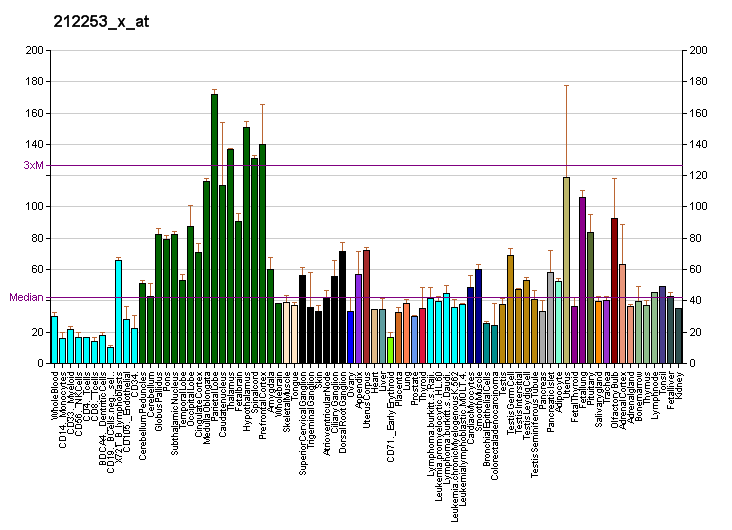

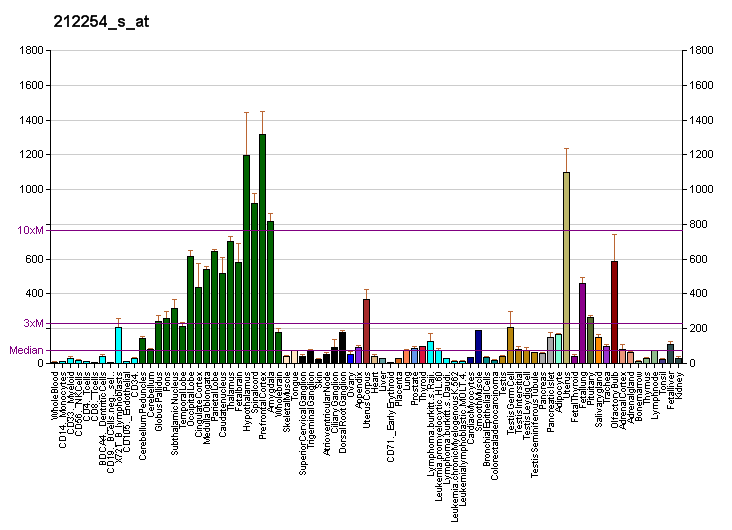

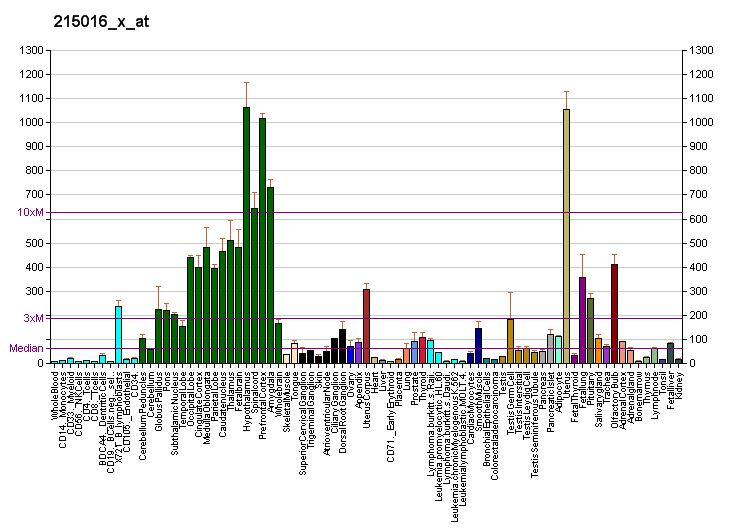
RNA expression pattern
Bgee	Human / Mouse (ortholog); Top expressed in: corpus callosum; Achilles tendon; internal globus pallidus; pars reticulata; inferior olivary nucleus; pars compacta; external globus pallidus; subthalamic nucleus; inferior ganglion of vagus nerve; body of uterus / n/a; More reference expression data
BioGPS	More reference expression data
Gene ontology
Molecular function	calcium ion binding; protein homodimerization activity; microtubule plus-end binding; metal ion binding; integrin binding; protein C-terminus binding; protein binding; actin binding; microtubule binding; structural molecule activity; cytoskeletal protein binding
Cellular component	cytoplasm; integral component of membrane; cell projection; nuclear envelope; endoplasmic reticulum membrane; membrane; focal adhesion; microtubule cytoskeleton; H zone; plasma membrane; hemidesmosome; microtubule plus-end; basement membrane; axon; cell junction; basal plasma membrane; cell cortex; Z discdkac; cell leading edge; endoplasmic reticulum; actin cytoskeleton; intermediate filament cytoskeleton; extracellular exosome; intermediate filament; cytoskeleton; microtubule; nucleus; cytosol; cytoplasmic vesicle; axon cytoplasm
Biological process	hemidesmosome assembly; cell motility; cell adhesion; response to wounding; intermediate filament cytoskeleton organization; integrin-mediated signaling pathway; maintenance of cell polarity; microtubule cytoskeleton organization; retrograde axonal transport; cytoskeleton organization; cytoplasmic microtubule organization; wound healing
Sources:Amigo / QuickGO
Orthologs
Databases	NCBI: entry; OMA: entry
Species	Human	Mouse
Entrez	667	n/a
Ensembl	ENSG00000151914	n/a
UniProt	Q03001	n/a
RefSeq (mRNA)	NM_001144769; NM_001144770; NM_001144771; NM_001723; NM_015548 NM_020388; NM_183380; NM_001374722; NM_001374729; NM_001374730; NM_001374734; NM_001374736; NM_001386100	n/a
RefSeq (protein)	NP_001138241; NP_001138242; NP_001714; NP_056363; NP_899236 NP_001361651; NP_001361658; NP_001361659; NP_001361663; NP_001361665	n/a
Location (UCSC)	Chr 6: 56.46 – 56.95 Mb	n/a
PubMed search		n/a
- Wikidata
View/Edit Human

Dystonin (DST), also known as bullous pemphigoid antigen 1 (BPAG1), isoforms 1/2/3/4/5/8, is a protein that in humans is encoded by the DST gene.

This gene encodes a member of the plakin protein family of adhesion junction plaque proteins. Multiple alternatively spliced transcript variants encoding distinct isoforms have been found for this gene, but the full-length nature of some variants has not been defined. It has been known that some isoforms are expressed in neural and muscle tissue, anchoring neural intermediate filaments to the actin cytoskeleton, and some isoforms are expressed in epithelial tissue, anchoring keratin-containing intermediate filaments to hemidesmosomes. Consistent with the expression, mice defective for this gene show skin blistering and neurodegeneration.

== Interactions ==
Dystonin has been shown to interact with collagen, type XVII, alpha 1, DCTN1, MAP1B and erbin.

== Loss of function in neurological disease ==
Several Dst mutant mouse lines have been described which share the common feature of having sensory neuron degeneration. In humans, loss of dystonin function can cause hereditary sensory and autonomic neuropathy type VI and axonal Charcot-Marie-Tooth disease. In both human diseases, pathology is likely attributable to the loss of the dystonin-a2 protein isoform, which plays a role in neuronal autophagy.

== See also ==
- Bullous pemphigoid
