= Transient acantholytic dermatosis =

Grover's disease
- Other names: benign papular acantholytic dermatosis, transient acantholytic dermatosis, persistent acantholytic dermatosis
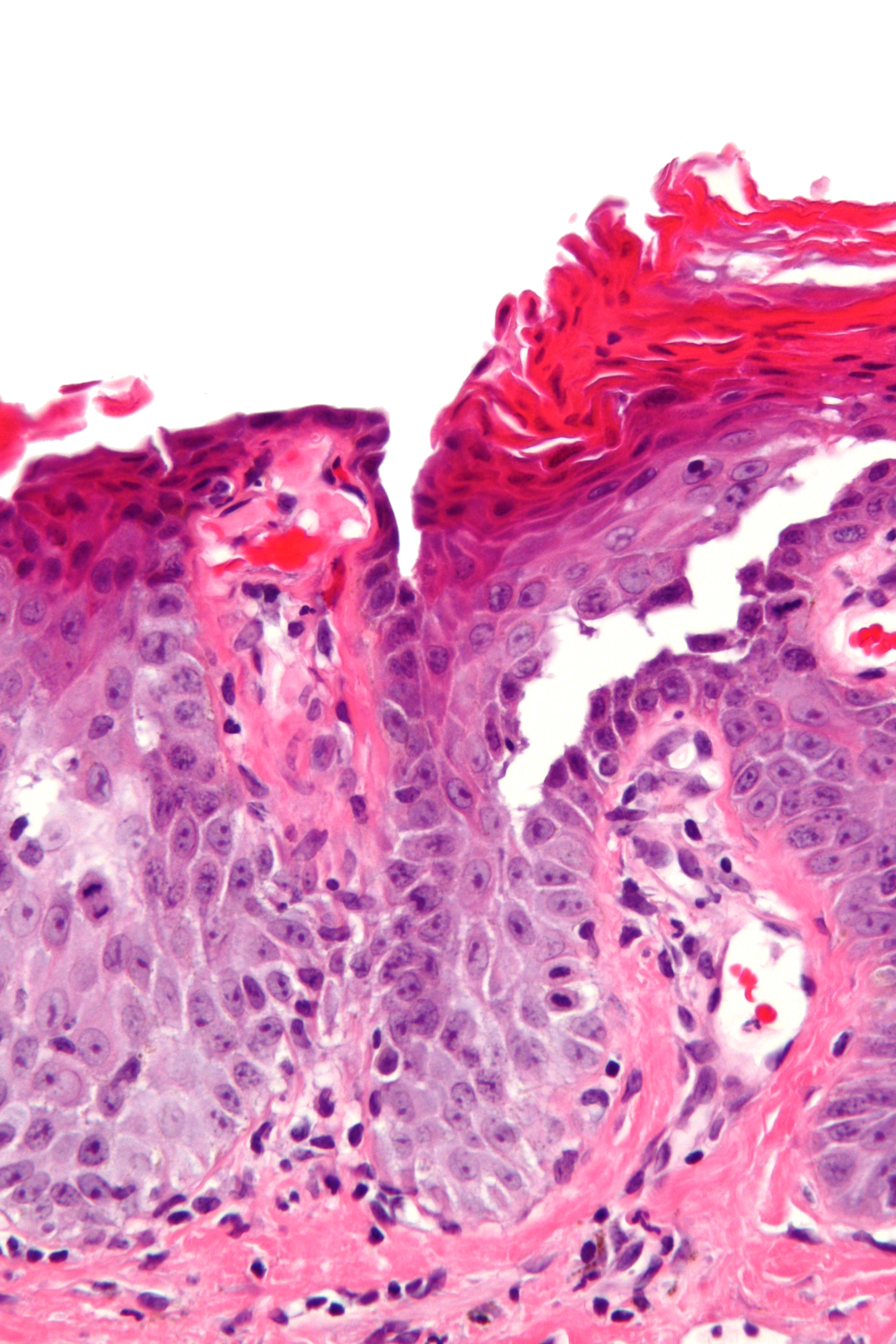
- Micrograph of transient acantholytic dermatosis, showing subcorneal separation and acantholysis. H&E stain.
- Specialty: Dermatology

Grover's disease (GD) is a polymorphic, pruritic, papulovesicular dermatosis characterized histologically by acantholysis with or without dyskeratosis. Once confirmed, most cases of Grover's disease last six to twelve months, which is why it was originally called "transient". However it may last much longer. Nevertheless, it is not to be confused with relapsing linear acantholytic dermatosis.

== Signs and symptoms ==
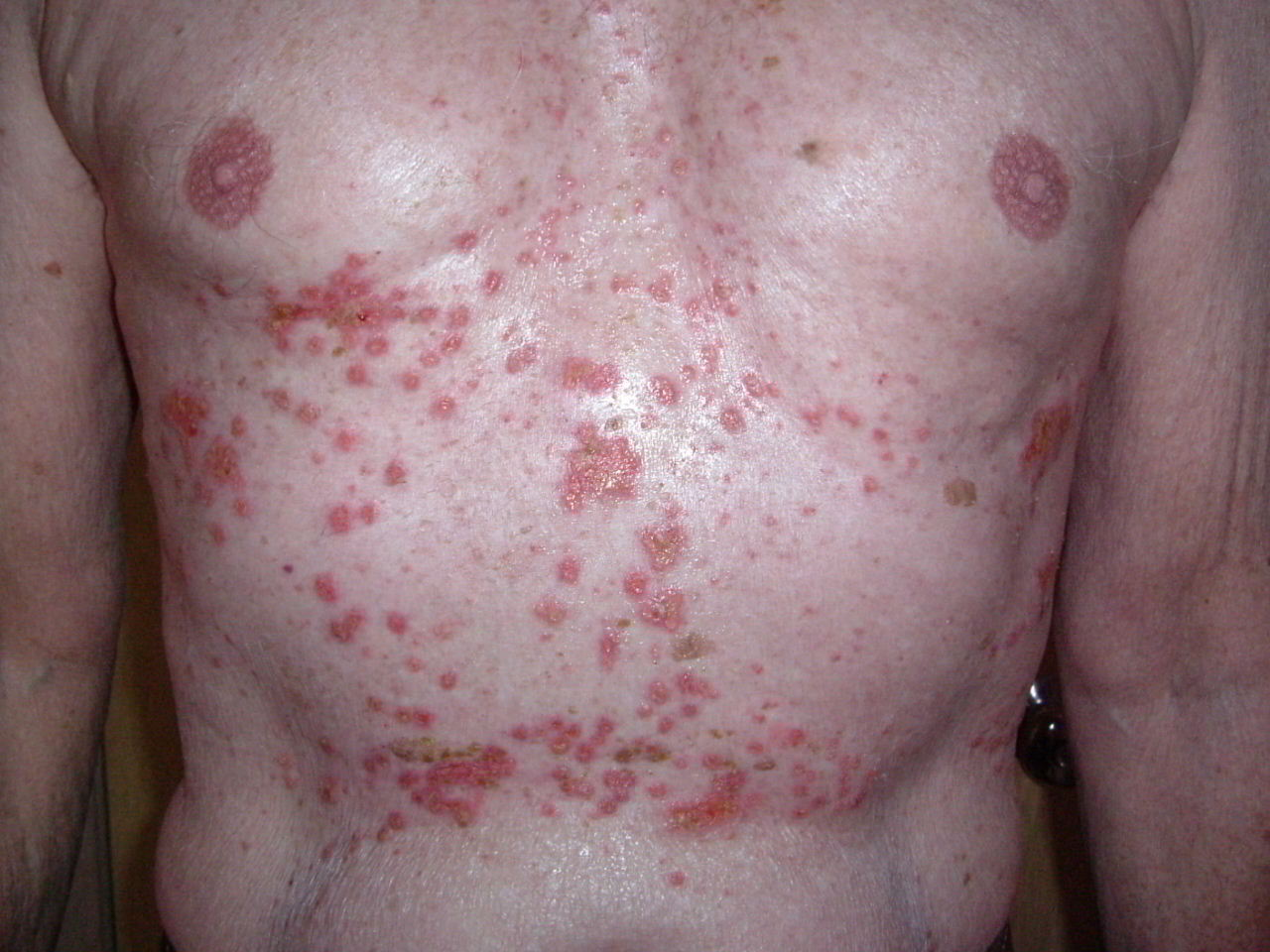
Advanced case, third month

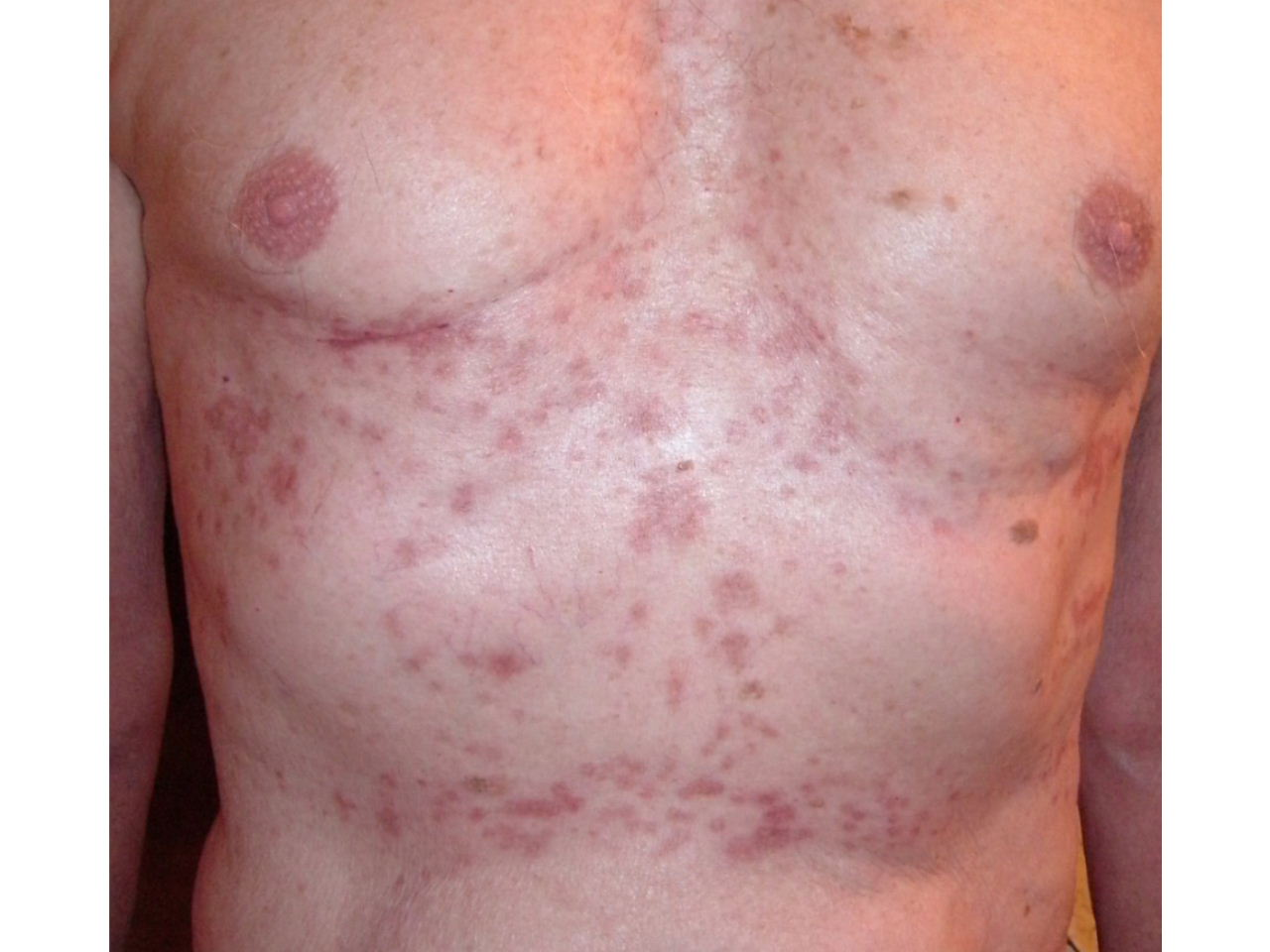
Advanced case, fifth month

Grover's disease often starts quite suddenly. There are intensely itchy spots on the central back, mid chest and occasionally elsewhere. Frequently, it follows sweating or some unexpected heat stress.

The itchy eruption lasts an average of 10–12 months. It is characterized by papules and papulovesicles with excoriations occurring on the chest, back, lower sternum, arms, and thighs. The papules are most commonly found on the mid chest.

Sometimes the features of Grover's are found in people who do not itch or have a conspicuous rash. Most of the people with Grover's who visit a dermatologist, however, itch a lot.

== Cause ==
The cause of Grover's disease is unknown. Suspected triggers of disease activity include heat and sweating, sunlight, and adverse reaction to medications as well as ionizing radiation, end-stage renal disease/hemodialysis, and mechanical irritation or prolonged bed rest.

Some cases of Grover's disease have been associated with medications such as sulfadoxine-pyrimethamine, ribavirin, cetuximab, and interleukin-4 [1,8-15]. One series of 300 patients with Grover's disease reported an association with other coexisting dermatoses including atopic dermatitis, contact dermatitis, and xerosis cutis. More recent reports have indicated a connection with the Moderna vaccine for Covid-19 and as a presenting symptom of SARS-CoV-2 infection itself. Finally, smaller series have detailed an association with pyoderma gangrenosum, bacterial and viral infections, and occasionally, malignancies.

== Diagnosis ==
Grover's may be suspected by its appearance, but since it has such a characteristic appearance under the microscope a shave skin or punch biopsy is often performed.

== Treatment ==
Sweating causes lesions to form, but lesions aggravated by sweat usually return to "normal" fairly quickly—avoiding sweat is not considered a reason to avoid exercise. Minor outbreaks can be controlled with prescription strength topical cortisone creams. More severe eruptions usually clear up after treatment for one to three months with isotretinoin or tetracycline. If these fail or the outbreak is severe, PUVA phototherapy treatments, antifungal medication and cortisone injections are alternatives.

Some research has suggested a correlation of Grover's disease with mercury toxicity in which case Dimercaptosuccinic acid might help.

== Epidemiology ==
The prevalence and incidence of Grover's disease have not been firmly established. In a study from Switzerland, Grover's disease was diagnosed in just 24 of more than 30,000 skin biopsies. Grover's disease is mainly seen in males over the age of forty.

Grover's disease affects chiefly white adults in the fifth decade or later, and appears to be around 1.6 to 2.1 times more common in men than in women. Grover's disease appears less commonly in darker-skinned individuals.

== History ==
This condition was first reported in 1975 by the American dermatopathologist, Ralph Wier Grover (1920–2008) while working at Franklin Hospital in New York. He described and examined around 40 patients having the characteristic signs of the disease, which now bears his name.
