= Amphitheatre of El Jem =

Ancient Roman amphitheater in El Djem, Tunisia

- Thysdrus Amphitheatre
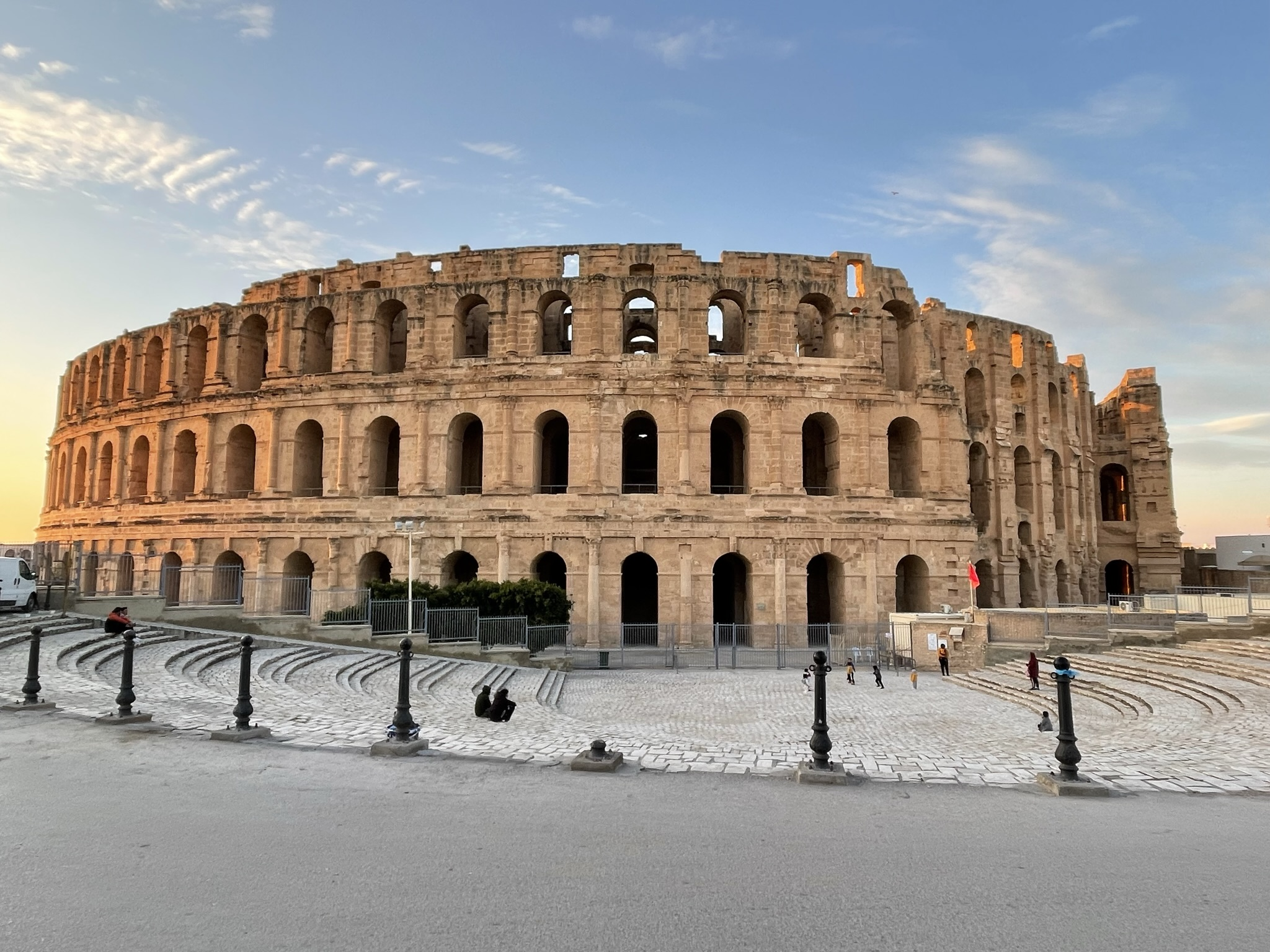
- Interactive map of Amphitheatre of El Jem
- Type: Amphitheatre
- Location: El Jem, Tunisia

History
- Built: 238; 1788 years ago
- Built by: Gordian III

Site notes
- Height: 36 m (118 ft)
- Length: 148 m (486 ft)
- Width: 122 m (400 ft)
- Architectural style: Roman Architecture

Amphitheatre of El Jem
UNESCO World Heritage Site
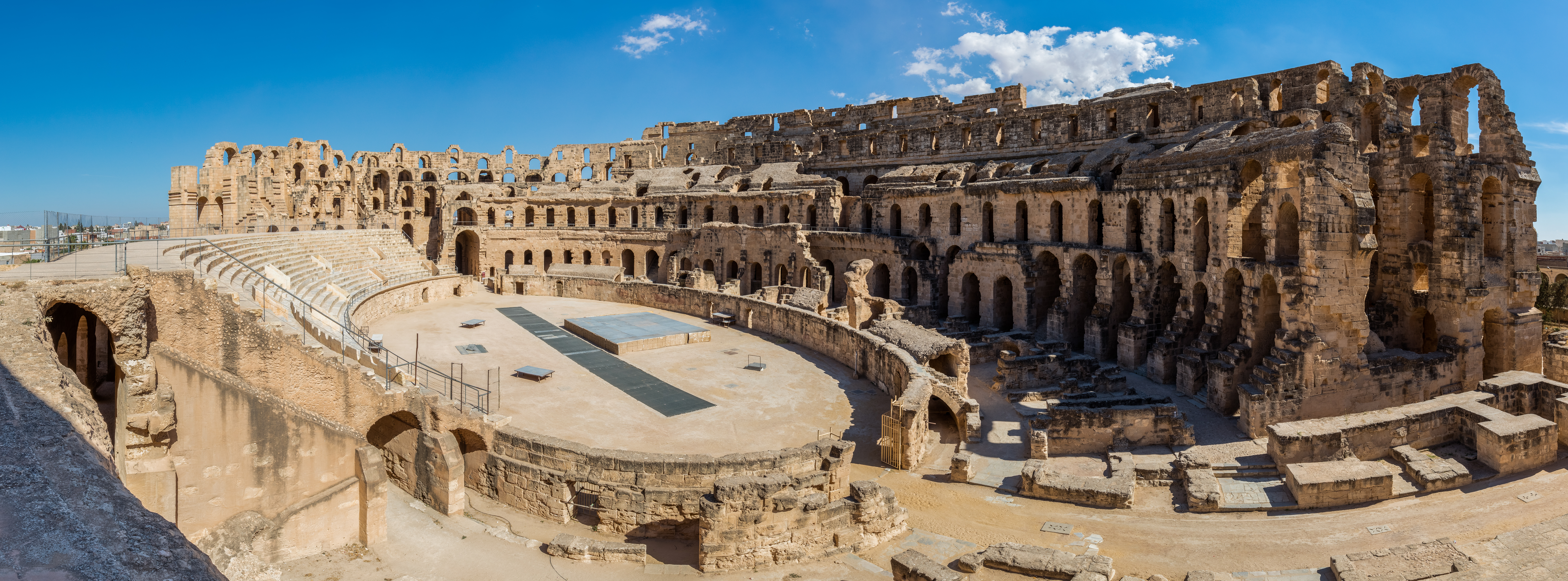
- Interior of the Amphitheatre of El Jem
- Interactive map of Amphitheatre of El Jem
- Location: Thysdrus, El Djem, Mahdia Governorate, Tunisia
- Criteria: Cultural: (iv), (vi)
- Reference: 38bis
- Inscription: 1979 (3rd Session)
- Extensions: 2010
- Area: 1.37 ha (0.0053 sq mi)
- Buffer zone: 26.42 ha (0.1020 sq mi)
- Coordinates: 35°17′47″N 10°42′25″E

The Amphitheatre of El Jem (Arabic: قصر الجم, romanized: Qaṣr al-Jamm) is an oval amphitheatre in the modern-day city of El Djem, Tunisia, formerly Thysdrus in the Roman province of Africa. It has been listed by UNESCO since 1979 as a World Heritage Site.

== History ==
The amphitheatre was built around 238 AD in Thysdrus, located in the Roman province of Africa Proconsularis in present-day El Djem, Tunisia. It is one of the best preserved Roman stone ruins in the world, and is unique in Africa. Like other amphitheatres in the Roman Empire, it was built for spectator events, and it is one of the biggest amphitheatres in the world. The estimated capacity is 35,000, and the major and minor axes respectively measure 148 metres (486 ft) and 122 metres (400 ft). The amphitheatre is built of stone blocks, located on flat ground, and is exceptionally well conserved.

The amphitheatre of El Jem is the third amphitheatre built in the same place. It is claimed that it was constructed by the local proconsul Gordian, who became emperor as Gordian II. However, no proconsul would have been in a position to commission such a building; furthermore, considering how brief Gordian II's "reign" was to be (a mere few weeks), it is surely impossible that he could have begun such a magnificent construction. What seems much more likely is that the young Gordian III was in fact born at Thysdrus, on his grandfather Gordian I's estates, and that as Emperor he intended the amphitheater to be part of an embellishment of his hometown, following in fact the example of Septimius Severus. After his death, his successors had neither reason nor inclination to complete these public works, so the amphitheatre remained unfinished.

In the Middle Ages, it served as a fortress, and the population sought shelter here during the attacks of Vandals in 430 and Arabs in 647. In 1695, during the Revolutions of Tunis, Mohamed Bey El Mouradi made an opening in one of the walls to stop the resistance of the followers of his brother Ali Bey al-Muradi, who gathered inside the amphitheater.

It is believed that the amphitheatre was used as a saltpetre factory at the end of the 18th and in the 19th century. Around 1850, the breach in the wall was enlarged by Ahmad I ibn Mustafa to approximately 30 metres (98 ft). In the second half of the 19th century, the structure was used for shops, dwellings, and grain storage.

== References in popular culture ==
It was featured in films such as Monty Python's Life of Brian and the television travel series Long Way Down.

American sportswear company Nike used this location in 1996 to shoot a television commercial titled "Good vs Evil", which depicts a gladiatorial-style soccer game set in a Roman amphitheatre. Football players from around the world, including Eric Cantona, Ronaldo, Paolo Maldini, Luís Figo, Patrick Kluivert and Jorge Campos defend "the beautiful game" against a team of unsportsmanlike demonic warriors, which ends with Cantona receiving the ball from Ronaldo, pulling up his shirt collar as was his trademark, and delivering the final line, "Au Revoir", before striking the ball which punches right through the demon goalkeeper.

The fourth episode of The Amazing Race 1 concluded at the amphitheatre.

== Gallery ==
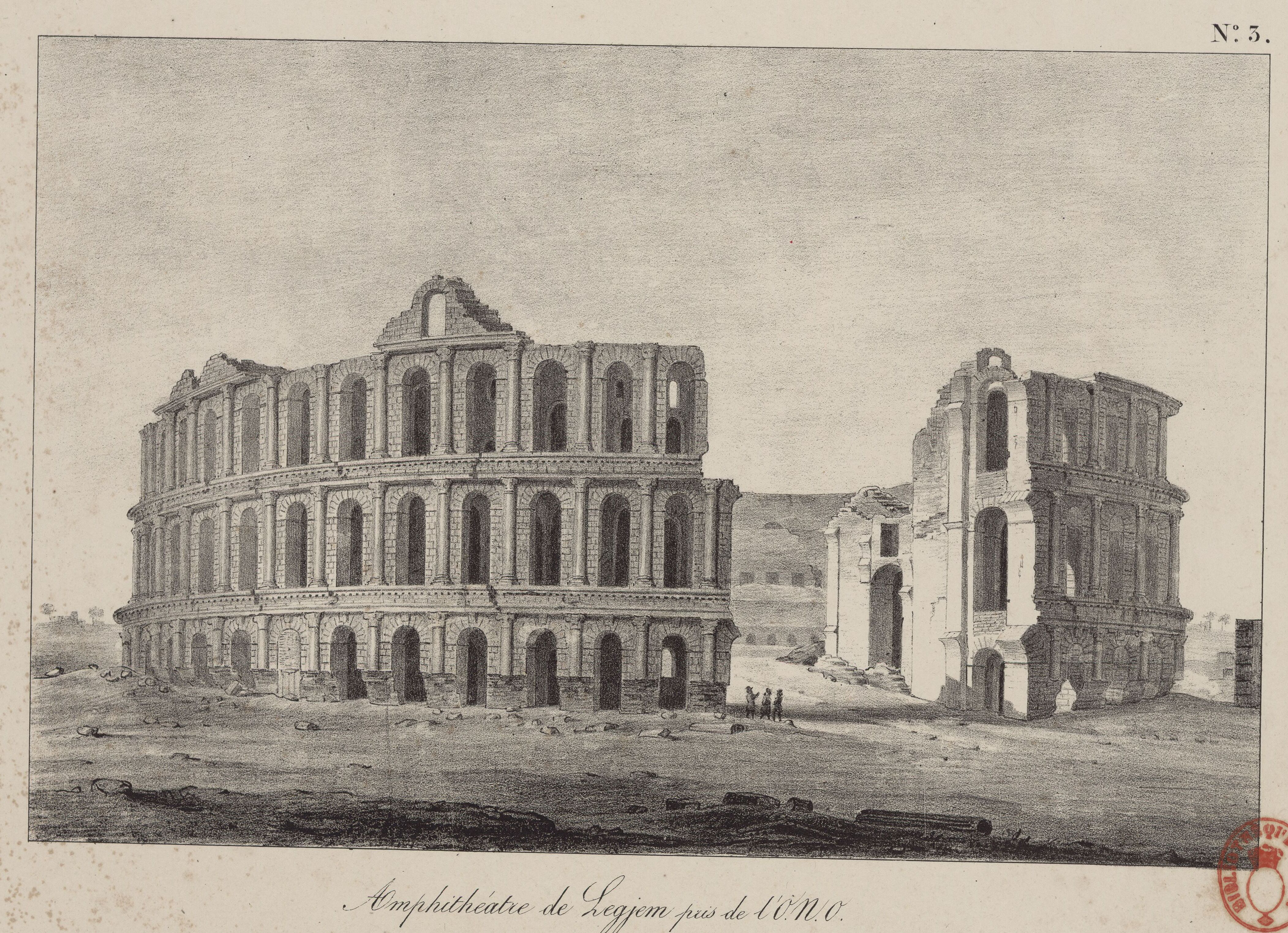
1833 sketch

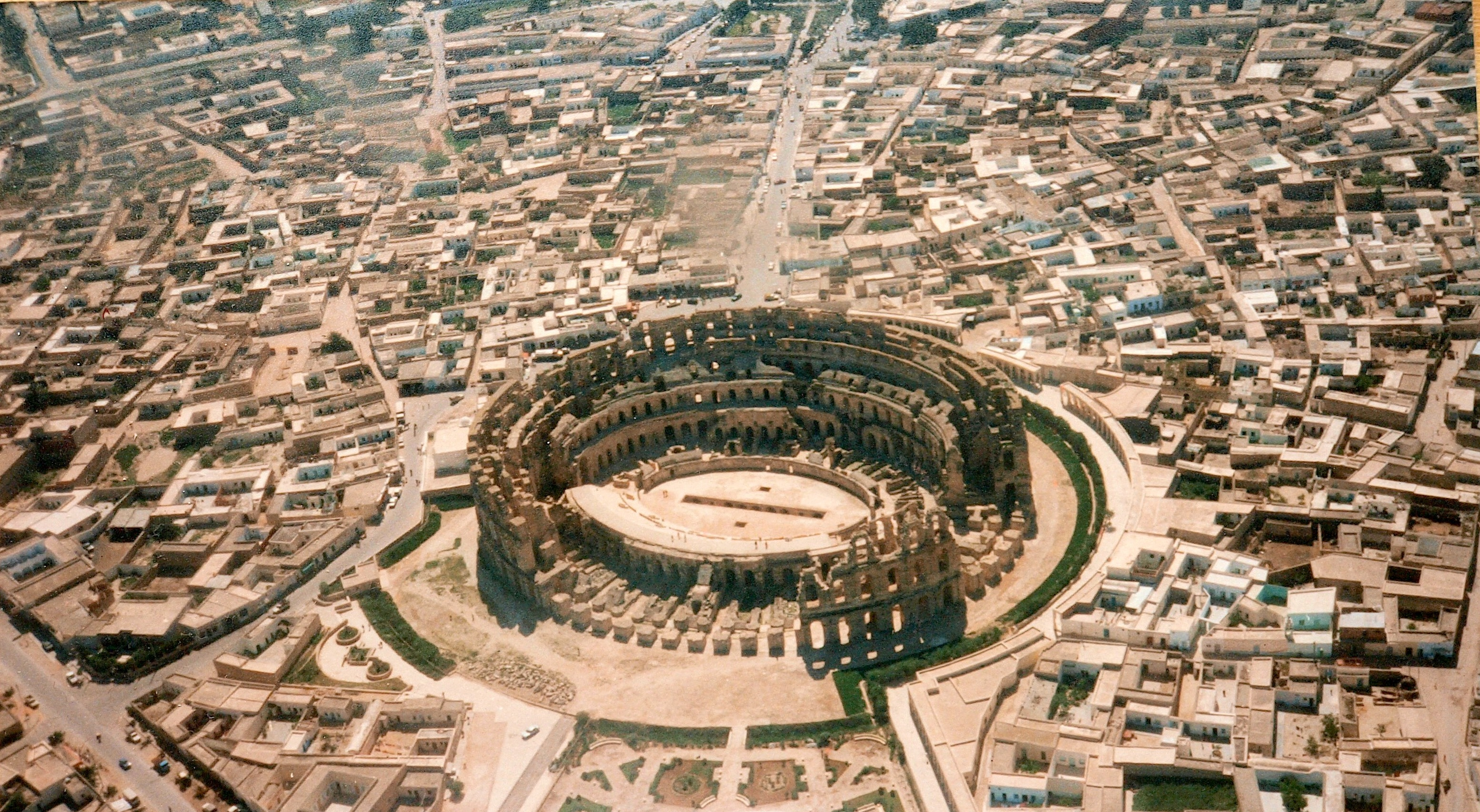
Aerial view (1986)

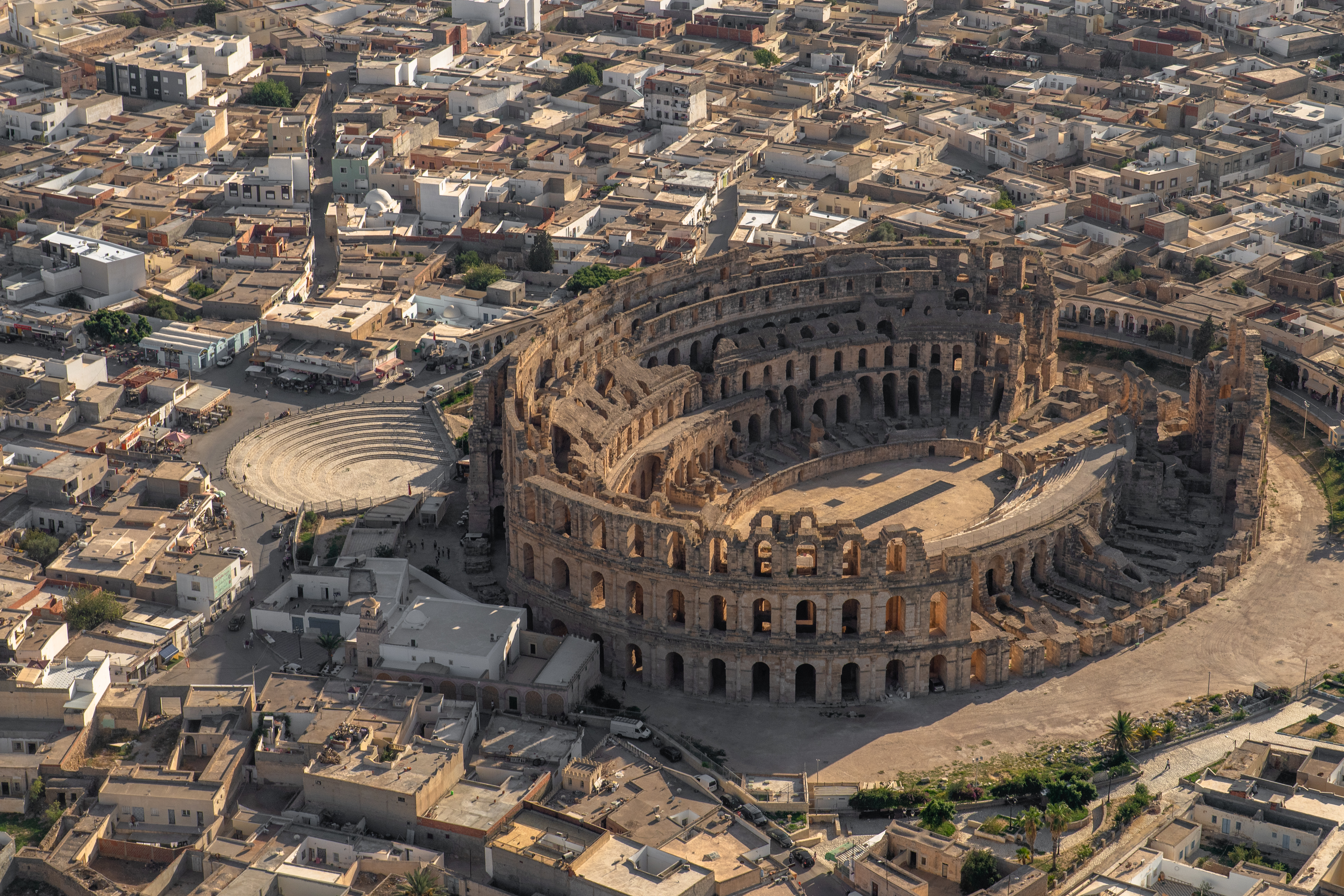
Aerial view (2023)

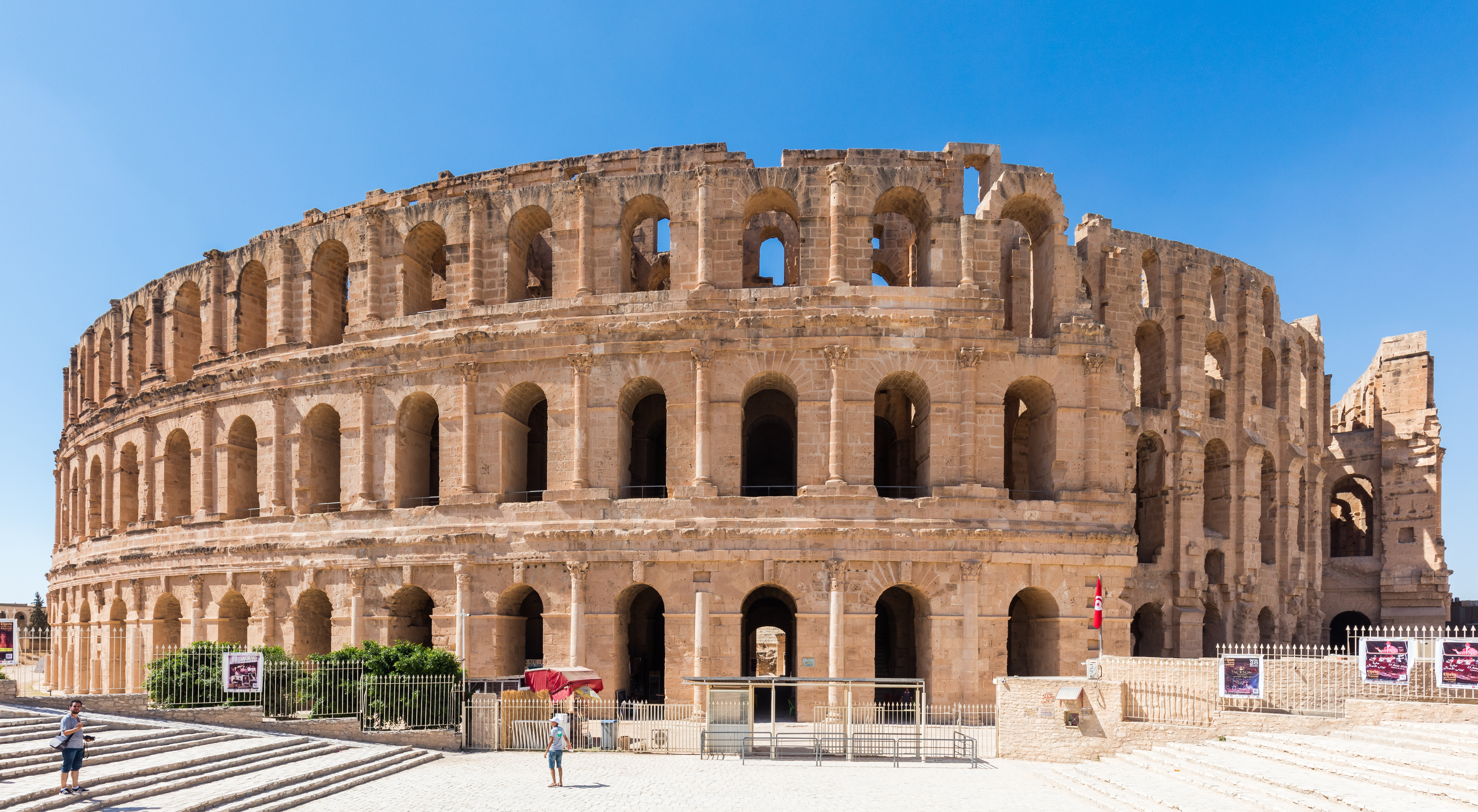
Exterior

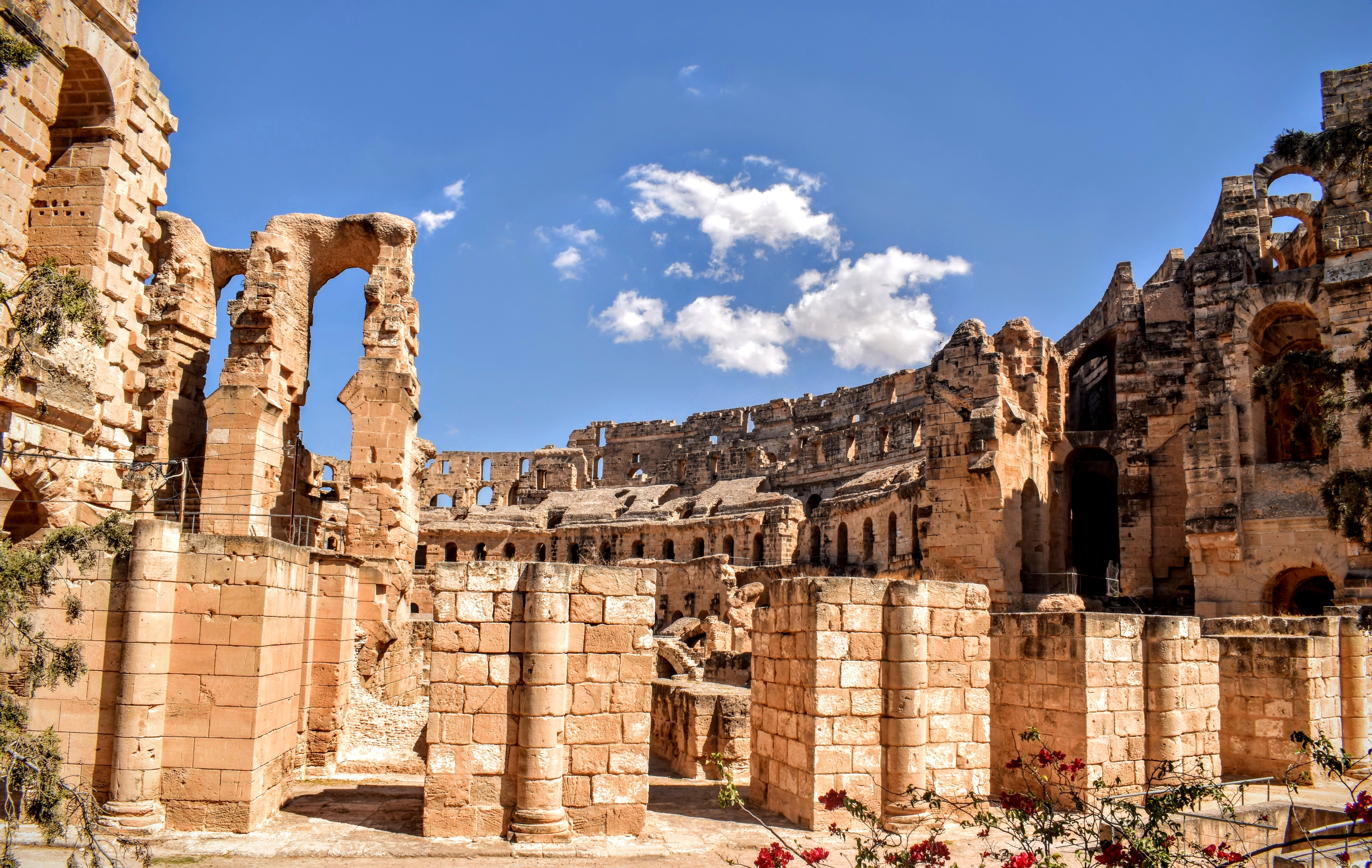
Cavea

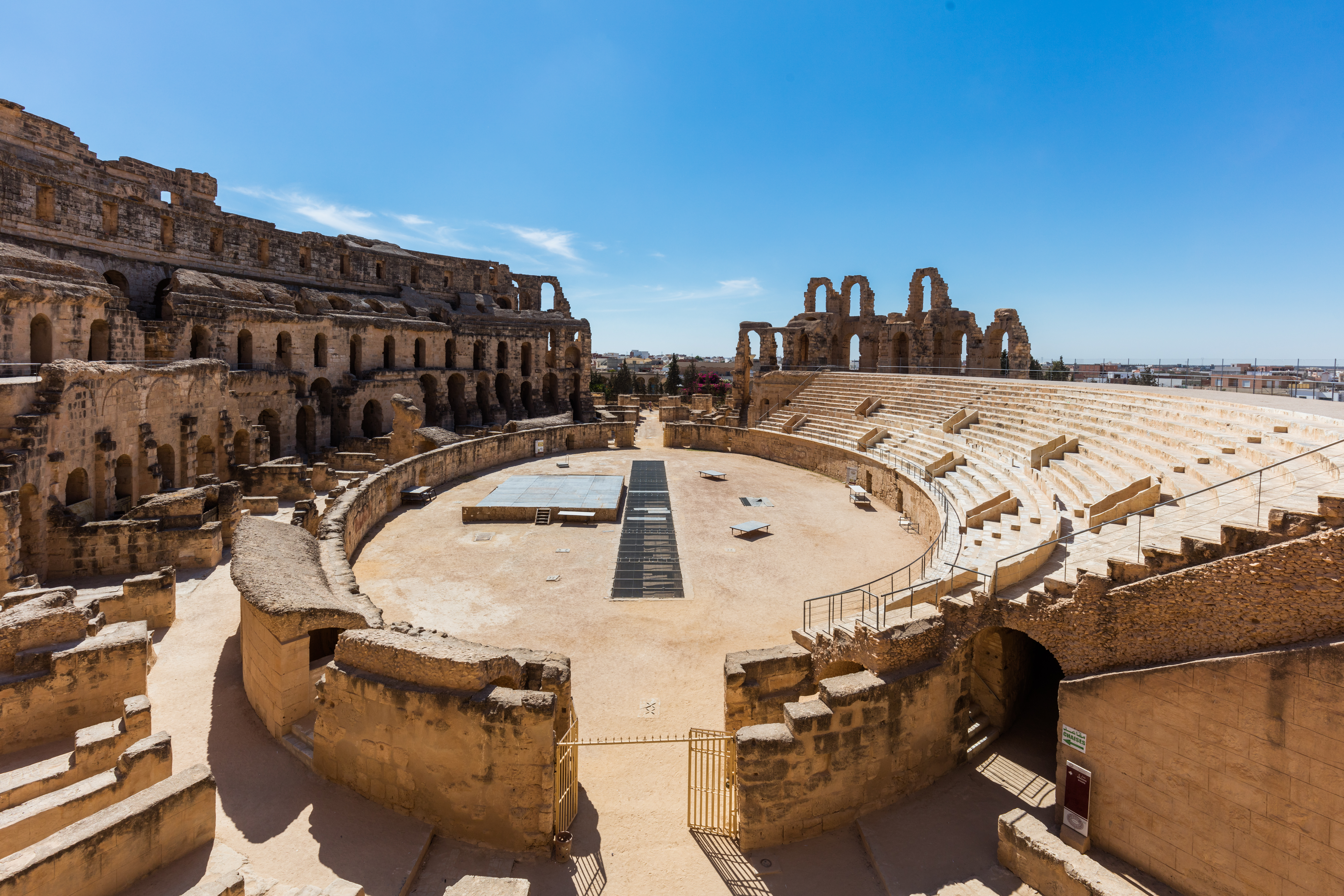
Arena

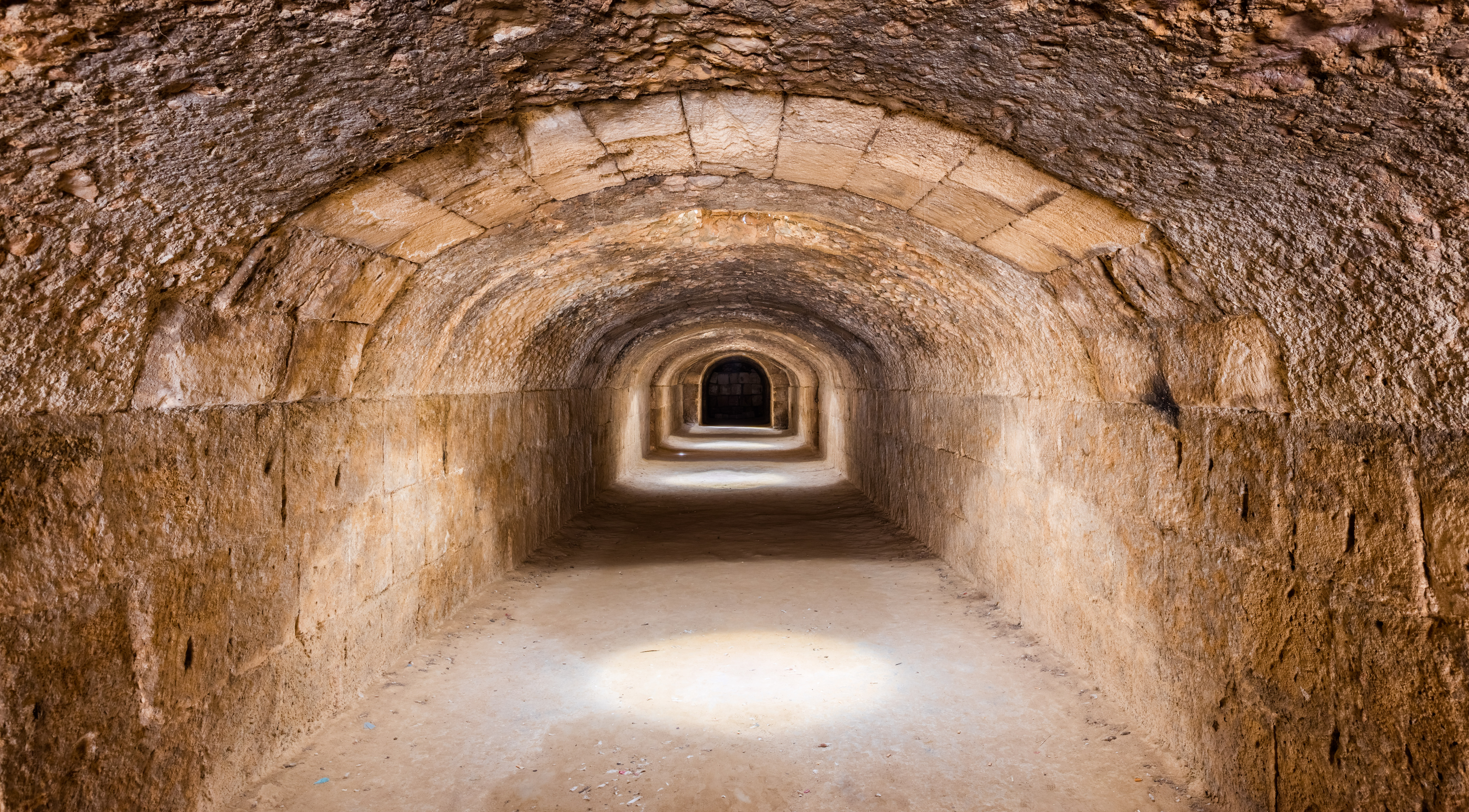
Hypogeum (basement)

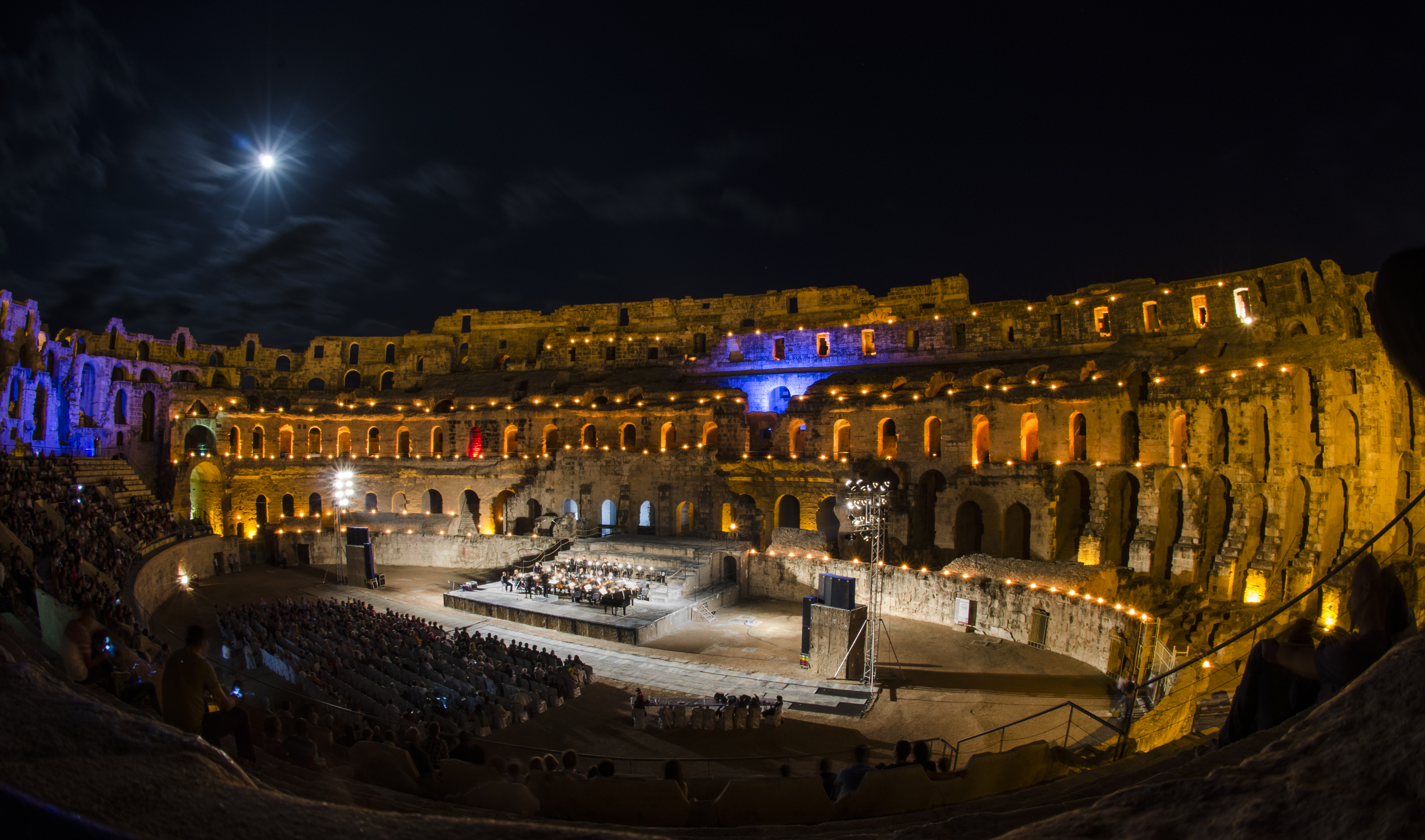
Closing concert of the 2013 Festival international de musique symphonique d'El Jem

== See also ==
- List of Roman amphitheatres
