= Antricoccus =

Scientific classification
- Domain: Bacteria
- Kingdom: Bacillati
- Phylum: Actinomycetota
- Class: Actinomycetes
- Order: Geodermatophilales
- Family: Antricoccaceae; Nouioui et al. 2018
- Genus: Antricoccus; Lee 2015
- Species: A. suffuscus

Binomial name
- Antricoccus suffuscus Lee 2015

Type strain
- C4-31; DSM 100065; KCTC 39556

Species of bacteria

The Antricoccus suffuscus is a species of bacteria.

== See also ==
- List of bacterial orders
- List of bacteria genera
