= Corneodesmosin =

Protein-coding gene in the species Homo sapiens

CDSN

Identifiers
- Aliases: CDSN, D6S586E, HTSS, HTSS1, HYPT2, PSS, PSS1, corneodesmosin, S
- External IDs: OMIM: 602593; MGI: 3505689; GeneCards: CDSN

Gene location (Human)
Chr.	Chromosome 6 (human)
Band	6p21.33	Start	31,115,087 bp
Band	6p21.33	End	31,120,446 bp

Gene location (Mouse)
Chr.	Chromosome 17 (mouse)
Band	17|17 B1	Start	35,863,025 bp
Band	17|17 B1	End	35,868,077 bp
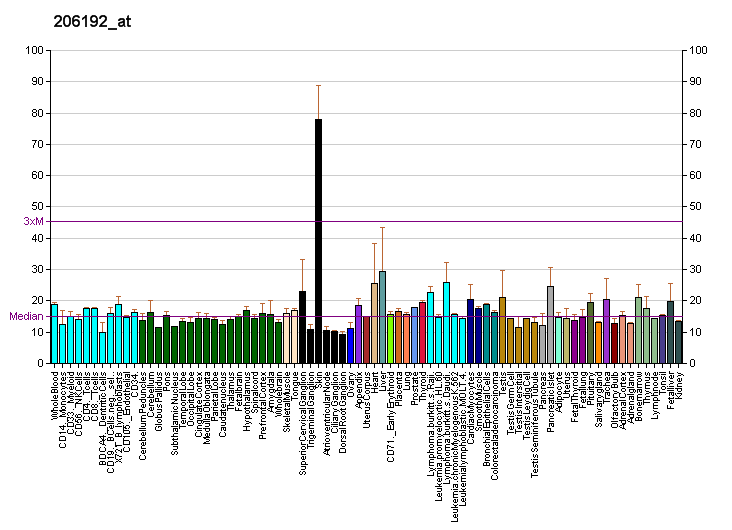

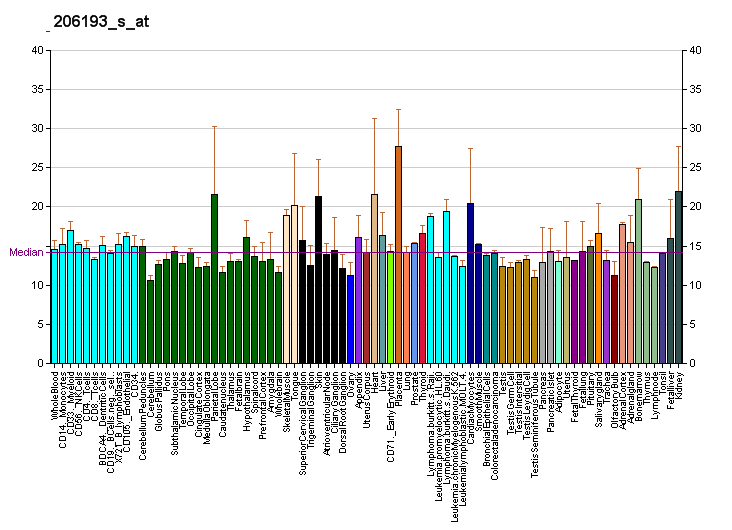
RNA expression pattern
Bgee	Human / Mouse (ortholog); Top expressed in: skin of abdomen; skin of leg; testicle; placenta; gastrocnemius muscle; vagina; skeletal muscle tissue; tonsil; gallbladder; duodenum / Top expressed in: lip; skin of external ear; esophagus; skin of back; superior surface of tongue; skin of abdomen; subcutaneous adipose tissue; white adipose tissue; cervix; gastrula; More reference expression data
BioGPS	More reference expression data
Gene ontology
Molecular function	protein homodimerization activity
Cellular component	extracellular region; desmosome; cell-cell junction; cornified envelope; plasma membrane
Biological process	cell adhesion; skin morphogenesis; keratinocyte differentiation; epidermis development; cornification; corneocyte desquamation; negative regulation of cornification; cell-cell adhesion
Sources:Amigo / QuickGO
Orthologs
Databases	NCBI: entry; OMA: entry
Species	Human	Mouse
Entrez	1041	386463
Ensembl	ENSG00000204539	ENSMUSG00000039518
UniProt	Q15517	Q7TPC1
RefSeq (mRNA)	NM_001264	NM_001008424; NM_001355275
RefSeq (protein)	NP_001255	NP_001008424; NP_001342204
Location (UCSC)	Chr 6: 31.12 – 31.12 Mb	Chr 17: 35.86 – 35.87 Mb
PubMed search
- Wikidata
View/Edit Human	View/Edit Mouse

Corneodesmosin is a protein that in humans is encoded by the CDSN gene.

This gene encodes a protein found in corneodesmosomes, which localize to the human epidermis and other cornified squamous epithelia. During maturation of the cornified layers, the protein undergoes a series of cleavages, which are thought to be required for desquamation. The gene is located in the major histocompatibility complex (MHC) class I region on chromosome 6.

== See also ==
- Hypertrichosis simplex of the scalp
- List of conditions caused by problems with junctional proteins
