= Envoplakin =

Protein-coding gene in the species Homo sapiens

EVPL

Identifiers
- Aliases: EVPL, EVPK, envoplakin
- External IDs: OMIM: 601590; MGI: 107507; GeneCards: EVPL
Available structures
PDB	Ortholog search: PDBe RCSB
PDB	List of PDB id codes 4QMD

Gene location (Human)
Chr.	Chromosome 17 (human)
Band	17q25.1	Start	76,004,502 bp
Band	17q25.1	End	76,027,306 bp

Gene location (Mouse)
Chr.	Chromosome 11 (mouse)
Band	11|11 E2	Start	116,111,385 bp
Band	11|11 E2	End	116,128,903 bp
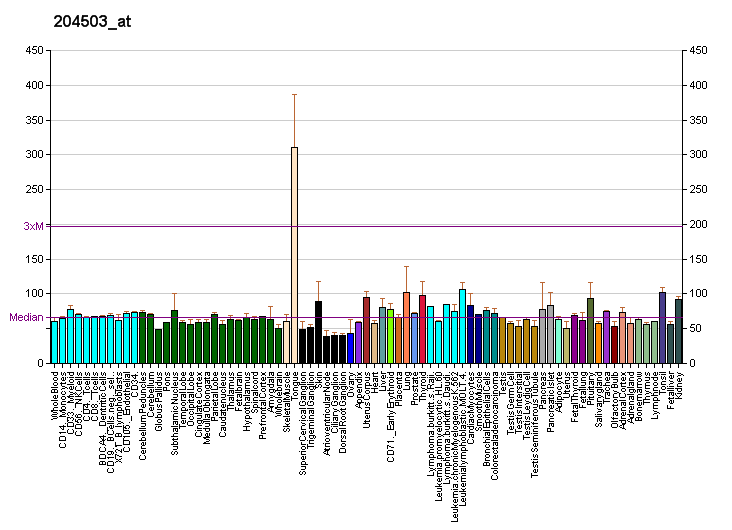
RNA expression pattern
Bgee	Human / Mouse (ortholog); Top expressed in: skin of abdomen; skin of leg; mucosa of pharynx; skin of arm; gums; oral cavity; gingival epithelium; skin of thigh; epithelium of esophagus; nipple / Top expressed in: esophagus; lip; epidermis; hair follicle; transitional epithelium of urinary bladder; skin of external ear; skin of abdomen; skin of back; conjunctival fornix; cornea; More reference expression data
BioGPS	More reference expression data
Gene ontology
Molecular function	protein-macromolecule adaptor activity; intermediate filament binding; structural molecule activity; cadherin binding
Cellular component	cell junction; desmosome; intermediate filament cytoskeleton; extracellular exosome; cytoskeleton; cornified envelope; cytoplasm; cytosol; intermediate filament; membrane
Biological process	peptide cross-linking; keratinization; keratinocyte differentiation; epidermis development; cornification; wound healing; intermediate filament cytoskeleton organization
Sources:Amigo / QuickGO
Orthologs
Databases	NCBI: entry; OMA: entry
Species	Human	Mouse
Entrez	2125	14027
Ensembl	ENSG00000167880	ENSMUSG00000034282
UniProt	Q92817	Q9D952
RefSeq (mRNA)	NM_001988; NM_001320747	NM_025276
RefSeq (protein)	NP_001307676; NP_001979; NP_001307676.1	NP_079552
Location (UCSC)	Chr 17: 76 – 76.03 Mb	Chr 11: 116.11 – 116.13 Mb
PubMed search
- Wikidata
View/Edit Human	View/Edit Mouse

Envoplakin is a protein that in humans is encoded by the EVPL gene.

== Interactions ==
Envoplakin has been shown to interact with PPL.

== See also ==
- List of target antigens in pemphigus
