= Periplakin =

Protein-coding gene in the species Homo sapiens

PPL

Identifiers
- Aliases: PPL, periplakin
- External IDs: OMIM: 602871; MGI: 1194898; GeneCards: PPL
Available structures
PDB	Ortholog search: PDBe RCSB
PDB	List of PDB id codes 4Q28

Gene location (Human)
Chr.	Chromosome 16 (human)
Band	16p13.3	Start	4,882,507 bp
Band	16p13.3	End	4,960,741 bp

Gene location (Mouse)
Chr.	Chromosome 16 (mouse)
Band	16 A1|16 2.5 cM	Start	4,904,155 bp
Band	16 A1|16 2.5 cM	End	4,950,285 bp
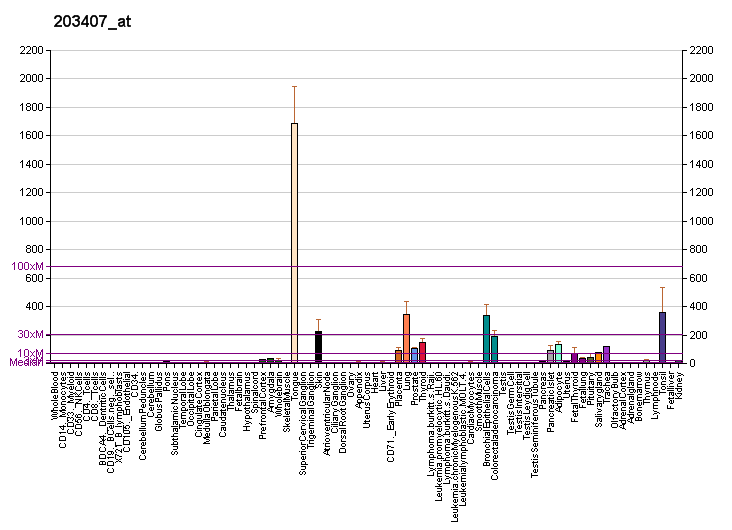
RNA expression pattern
Bgee	Human / Mouse (ortholog); Top expressed in: oral cavity; amniotic fluid; mucosa of pharynx; gums; buccal mucosa cell; gingival epithelium; cervix epithelium; skin of arm; vulva; human penis / Top expressed in: superior surface of tongue; corneal stroma; esophagus; skin of external ear; skin of back; lip; skin of abdomen; epidermis; umbilical cord; hair follicle; More reference expression data
BioGPS	More reference expression data
Gene ontology
Molecular function	structural constituent of cytoskeleton; protein binding; cadherin binding; structural molecule activity
Cellular component	cytoplasm; cell junction; plasma membrane; desmosome; extracellular exosome; cytoskeleton; membrane; mitochondrion; nucleus; cornified envelope; cytosol; intermediate filament
Biological process	keratinization; cytoskeleton organization; cornification; response to mechanical stimulus; wound healing; intermediate filament cytoskeleton organization
Sources:Amigo / QuickGO
Orthologs
Databases	NCBI: entry; OMA: entry
Species	Human	Mouse
Entrez	5493	19041
Ensembl	ENSG00000118898	ENSMUSG00000039457
UniProt	O60437	Q9R269
RefSeq (mRNA)	NM_002705	NM_008909
RefSeq (protein)	NP_002696	NP_032935
Location (UCSC)	Chr 16: 4.88 – 4.96 Mb	Chr 16: 4.9 – 4.95 Mb
PubMed search
- Wikidata
View/Edit Human	View/Edit Mouse

Periplakin is a protein that in humans is encoded by the PPL gene.

The protein encoded by this gene is a component of desmosomes and of the epidermal cornified envelope in keratinocytes. The N-terminal domain of this protein interacts with the plasma membrane and its C-terminus interacts with intermediate filaments. Through its rod domain, this protein forms complexes with envoplakin. This protein may serve as a link between the cornified envelope and desmosomes as well as intermediate filaments. AKT1/PKB, a protein kinase mediating a variety of cell growth and survival signaling processes, is reported to interact with this protein, suggesting a possible role for this protein as a localization signal in AKT1-mediated signaling.

== Interactions ==
PPL (gene) has been shown to interact with Keratin 8 and Envoplakin.

== See also ==
- List of target antigens in pemphigus
