= Geodermatophilaceae =

- Goekera deserti was named Modestobacter deserti when it was first described. Subsequent research led to its reclassification into the genus Geokera.

Scientific classification
- Domain: Bacteria
- Kingdom: Bacillati
- Phylum: Actinomycetota
- Class: Actinomycetes
- Order: Geodermatophilales
- Family: Geodermatophilaceae; Normand 2006

Type genus
- Geodermatophilus Luedemann 1968

Genera
- "Actinotelluria"; Blastococcus; Geodermatophilus; Goekera; Klenkia; Modestobacter; Petropleomorpha; Trujillonella

Family of bacteria

The Geodermatophilaceae are an actinomycete family of bacteria.

== Phylogeny ==
The currently accepted taxonomy is based on the List of Prokaryotic names with Standing in Nomenclature (LPSN) and National Center for Biotechnology Information (NCBI).

16S rRNA based LTP_10_2024

- Geodermatophilaceae
  - Blastococcus~ [incl. Trujillonella]
  - - Blastococcus
    - - - Klenkia
        - - Goekera
          - Modestobacter
      - Geodermatophilus
        [incl. Petropleomorpha]

120 marker proteins based GTDB 10-RS226

- Geodermatophilaceae
  - - - Goekera Montero-Calasanz et al. 2023
      - Klenkia Montero-Calasanz et al. 2018
    - Modestobacter Mevs et al. 2000
  - - Petropleomorpha Li 2023
    - - Blastococcus Ahrens & Moll 1970
      - Geodermatophilus Luedemann 1968
        [incl. Trujillonella Wang et al. 2025]

== See also ==
- List of bacterial orders
- List of bacteria genera
