= Geodermatophilales =

Scientific classification
- Domain: Bacteria
- Kingdom: Bacillati
- Phylum: Actinomycetota
- Class: Actinomycetes
- Order: Geodermatophilales; Sen et al. 2014

Type genus
- Geodermatophilus Luedemann 1968

Families
- Antricoccaceae; Geodermatophilaceae

Synonyms
- Antricoccales Salam et al. 2020

Order of bacteria

The Geodermatophilales are an order of bacteria. Members of the order are Gram-positive, aerobic, and can be motile. They mainly inhabit arid and degraded habitats but also marine and plant-associated environments. Members have pigmented colonies.

== Phylogeny ==
The currently accepted taxonomy is based on the List of Prokaryotic names with Standing in Nomenclature (LPSN) and National Center for Biotechnology Information (NCBI).

16S rRNA based LTP_10_2024

- - Jatrophihabitantales
    Jatrophihabitantaceae
  - Geodermatophilales
    - Antricoccaceae
    - Geodermatophilaceae

120 marker proteins based GTDB 10-RS226

- Mycobacteriales
  - Geodermatophilaceae Normand 2006
  - - Jatrophihabitantaceae Nouioui et al. 2018
    - - Antricoccaceae Nouioui et al. 2018
      - other

== See also ==
- List of bacterial orders
- List of bacteria genera
