= Desmocollin =

Subfamily of proteins

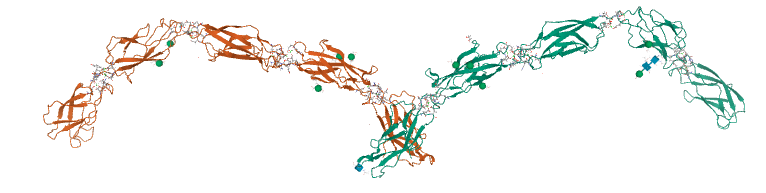
Crystal structure of human Desmocollin-1 ectodomain, PDB 5IRY

Desmocollins are a subfamily of desmosomal cadherins, the transmembrane constituents of desmosomes. They are co-expressed with desmogleins to link adjacent cells by extracellular adhesion. There are seven desmosomal cadherins in humans, three desmocollins and four desmogleins. Desmosomal cadherins allow desmosomes to contribute to the integrity of tissue structure in multicellular living organisms.

== Structure ==
Three isoforms of desmocollin proteins have been identified.

- Desmocollin-1, coded by the DSC1 gene
- Desmocollin-2, coded by the DSC2 gene
- Desmocollin-3, coded by the DSC3 gene

Each desmocollin gene encodes a pair of proteins: a longer 'a' form and a shorter 'b' form. The 'a' and 'b' forms differ in the length of their C-terminus tails. The protein pair is generated by alternative splicing.

Desmocollin has four cadherin-like extracellular domains, an extracellular anchor domain, and an intracellular anchor domain. Additionally, the 'a' form has an intracellular cadherin-like sequence domain, which provides binding sites for other desmosomal proteins such as plakoglobin.

== Expression ==
The desmosomal cadherins are expressed in tissue-specific patterns. Desmocollin-2 and desmoglein-2 are found in all desmosome-containing tissues such as colon and cardiac muscle tissues, while other desmosomal cadherins are restricted to stratified epithelial tissues.

All seven desmosomal cadherins are expressed in epidermis, but in a differentiation-specific manner. The '2' and '3' isoforms of desmocollin and desmoglein are expressed in the lower epidermal layers, and the '1' proteins and desmoglein-4 are expressed in the upper epidermal layers. Different isoforms are located in the same individual cells, and single desmosomes contain more than one isoform of both desmocollin and desmoglein.

It is unclear why there are multiple desmosomal cadherin isoforms. It is thought that they may have different adhesive properties that are required at different levels in stratified epithelia or that they have specific functions in epithelial differentiation.

== Disorders ==
Desmosomes are involved in cell-cell adhesion, and are particularly important for the integrity of heart and skin tissue. Because of this, desmocollin gene mutations can affect the adhesion of cells that undergo mechanical stress, notably cardiomyocytes and keratinocytes. Genetic disorders associated with desmocollin gene mutations include Carvajal syndrome, striate palmoplantar keratoderma, Naxos disease, and arrhythmogenic right ventricular cardiomyopathy.

There is also evidence that autoimmunity against desmosomal cadherins contributes to cardiac inflammation associated with arrhythmogenic right ventricular cardiomyopathy, and that anti-desmosomal cadherin antibodies may represent new therapeutic targets.

== See also ==
- Desmoglein, a subfamily of desmosomal cadherins
- Armadillo protein family, instrumental in the cytoplasmic anchoring of cadherins
  - Plakoglobin
  - Plakophilin
- Plakin protein family, associates intercellular bridges to cytoskeleton
  - Desmoplakin
- List of target antigens in pemphigus
- List of conditions caused by problems with junctional proteins
