= Plakophilin-2 =

Protein-coding gene in the species Homo sapiens

PKP2

Identifiers
- Aliases: PKP2, ARVD9, plakophilin 2
- External IDs: OMIM: 602861; MGI: 1914701; GeneCards: PKP2
Available structures
PDB	Ortholog search: PDBe RCSB
PDB	List of PDB id codes 3TT9,%%s3TT9

Gene location (Human)
Chr.	Chromosome 12 (human)
Band	12p11.21	Start	32,790,755 bp
Band	12p11.21	End	32,896,777 bp

Gene location (Mouse)
Chr.	Chromosome 16 (mouse)
Band	16|16 A2	Start	16,031,182 bp
Band	16|16 A2	End	16,090,576 bp
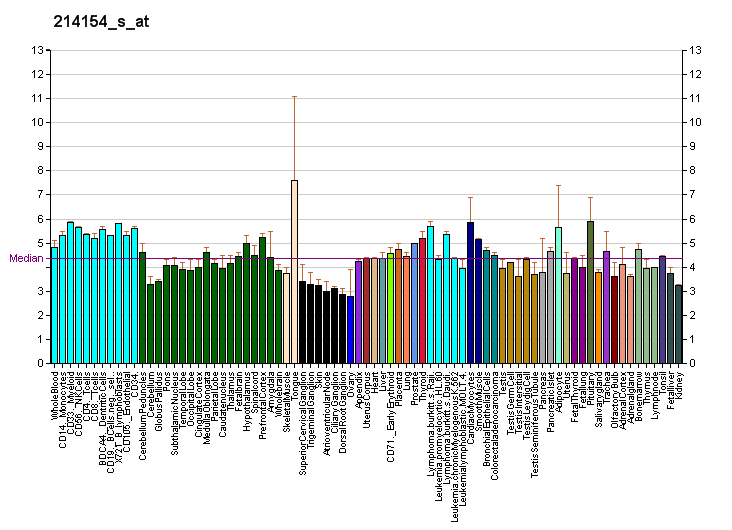

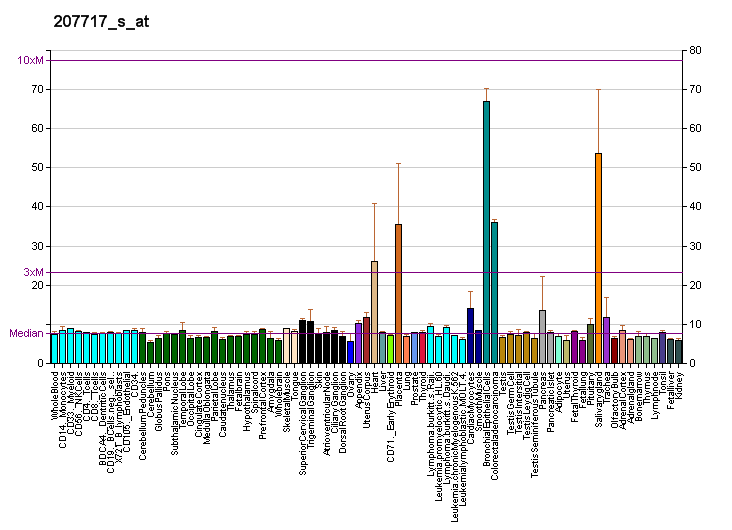
RNA expression pattern
Bgee	Human / Mouse (ortholog); Top expressed in: right ventricle; apex of heart; myocardium of left ventricle; right uterine tube; right auricle of heart; cardiac muscle tissue of right atrium; mucosa of colon; mucosa of sigmoid colon; rectum; mucosa of transverse colon / Top expressed in: Ileal epithelium; superior surface of tongue; gallbladder; atrioventricular valve; myocardium of ventricle; cardiac muscle tissue of left ventricle; endocardial cushion; atrium; Paneth cell; epithelium of lens; More reference expression data
BioGPS	More reference expression data
Gene ontology
Molecular function	sodium channel regulator activity; intermediate filament binding; transmembrane transporter binding; protein binding; cell adhesive protein binding involved in bundle of His cell-Purkinje myocyte communication; molecular adaptor activity; alpha-catenin binding; protein kinase C binding; cadherin binding
Cellular component	integral component of membrane; intercalated disc; cell-cell junction; adherens junction; plasma membrane; desmosome; nucleoplasm; cell junction; intermediate filament; nucleus; cornified envelope; messenger ribonucleoprotein complex; cytoplasm
Biological process	intermediate filament bundle assembly; cell communication by electrical coupling involved in cardiac conduction; ventricular cardiac muscle cell action potential; cardiac muscle cell action potential involved in contraction; bundle of His cell-Purkinje myocyte adhesion involved in cell communication; cell-cell signaling involved in cardiac conduction; ventricular cardiac muscle tissue morphogenesis; development of the heart; desmosome assembly; cell adhesion; positive regulation of sodium ion transport; regulation of heart rate by cardiac conduction; regulation of ventricular cardiac muscle cell action potential; maintenance of animal organ identity; keratinization; cornification; protein localization to plasma membrane; cell-cell adhesion; cell-cell junction assembly; adherens junction maintenance
Sources:Amigo / QuickGO
Orthologs
Databases	NCBI: entry; OMA: entry
Species	Human	Mouse
Entrez	5318	67451
Ensembl	ENSG00000057294	ENSMUSG00000041957
UniProt	Q99959	Q9CQ73
RefSeq (mRNA)	NM_004572; NM_001005242	NM_026163
RefSeq (protein)	NP_001005242; NP_004563	NP_080439
Location (UCSC)	Chr 12: 32.79 – 32.9 Mb	Chr 16: 16.03 – 16.09 Mb
PubMed search
- Wikidata
View/Edit Human	View/Edit Mouse

Plakophilin-2 is a protein that in humans is encoded by the PKP2 gene. Plakophilin 2 is expressed in skin and cardiac muscle, where it functions to link cadherins to intermediate filaments in the cytoskeleton. In cardiac muscle, plakophilin-2 is found in desmosome structures located within intercalated discs. Mutations in PKP2 have been shown to be causal in arrhythmogenic right ventricular cardiomyopathy.

== Structure ==
Two splice variants of the PKP2 gene have been identified. The first has a molecular weight of 97.4 kDa (881 amino acids) and the second of molecular weight of 92.7 kDa (837 amino acids). A processed pseudogene with high similarity to this locus has been mapped to chromosome 12p13.

Plakophilin-2 is a member of the armadillo repeat and plakophilin protein family. Plakophilin proteins contain nine central, conserved armadillo repeat domains flanked by N-terminal and C-terminal domains. Alternately spliced transcripts encoding protein isoforms have been identified.

Plakophilin 2 localizes to cell desmosomes and nuclei and binds plakoglobin, desmoplakin, and the desmosomal cadherins via N-terminal head domain.

== Function ==
Plakophilin 2 functions to link cadherins to intermediate filaments in the cytoskeleton. In cardiomyocytes, plakophilin-2 is found at desmosome structures within intercalated discs, which link adjacent sarcolemmal membranes together. The desmosomal protein, desmoplakin, is the core constituent of the plaque which anchors intermediate filaments to the sarcolemma by its C-terminus and indirectly to sarcolemmal cadherins by its N-terminus, facilitated by plakoglobin and plakophilin-2. Plakophilin is necessary for normal localization and content of desmoplakin to desmosomes, which may in part be due to the recruitment of protein kinase C alpha to desmoplakin.

Ablation of PKP2 in mice severely disrupts normal heart morphogenesis. Mutant mice are embryonic lethal and exhibit deficits in the formation of adhering junctions in cardiomyocytes, including the dissociation of desmoplakin and formation of cytoplasmic granular aggregates around embryonic day 10.5-11. Additional malformation included reduced trabeculation, cytoskeletal disarray and cardiac wall rupture. Further studies demonstrated that plakophilin-2 coordinate with E-cadherin is required to properly localize RhoA early in actin cytoskeletal rearrangement in order to properly couple the assembly of adherens junctions to the translocation of desmosome precursors in newly formed cell-cell junctions.

Plakophilin-2 over time has shown to be more than components of cell-cell junctions; rather the plakophilins are emerging as versatile scaffolds for various signaling pathways that more globally modulate diverse cellular activities. Plakophilin-2 has shown to localize to nuclei, in addition to desmosomal plaques in the cytoplasm. Studies have shown that plakkophillin-2 is found in the nucleoplasm, complexed in the RNA polymerase III holoenzyme with the largest subunit of RNA polymerase III, termed RPC155.

There are data to support molecular crosstalk between plakophilin-2 and proteins involved in mechanical junctions in cardiomyocytes, including connexin 43, the major component of cardiac gap junctions; the voltage-gated sodium channel Na(V)1.5 and its interacting subunit, ankyrin G; and the K(ATP). Decreased expression of plakophilin-2 via siRNA leads to a decrease in and redistribution of connexin 43 protein, as well as a decrease in coupling of adjacent cardiomyocytes. Studies also showed that GJA1 and plakophilin-2 are components in the same biomolecular complex. Plakophilin-2 also associates with Na(V)1.5, and knockdown of plakophilin-2 in cardiomyocytes alters sodium current properties as well as velocity of action potential propagation. It has also been demonstrated that plakophilin-2 associates with an important component of the Na(V)1.5 complex, ankyrin G, and loss of ankyrin G via siRNA downregulation mislocalized plakophilin-2 and connexin 43 in cardiac cells, which was coordinate with decreased electrical coupling of cells and decreased adhesion strength. These studies were further supported by an investigation in a mouse model harboring a PKP2-heterozygous null mutation, which showed decreased Na(V)1.5 amplitude, as well as a shift in gating and kinetics; pharmacological challenge also induced ventricular arrhythmias. These findings further support the notion that desmosomes crosstalk with sodium channels in the heart, and suggest that the risk of arrhythmias in patients with PKP2 mutations may be unveiled with pharmacological challenge. Evidence has also shown that plakophilin-2 binds to the K(ATP) channel subunit, Kir6.2, and that in cardiomyocytes from haploinsufficient PKP2 mice, K(ATP) channel current density was ~40% smaller and regional heterogeneity of K(ATP) channels was altered, suggesting that plakophilin-2 interacts with K(ATP) and mediates crosstalk between intercellular junctions and membrane excitability.

== Clinical significance ==
Mutations in PKP2 have been associated with, have been shown to cause, and are considered common in arrhythmogenic right ventricular cardiomyopathy, which is characterized by fibrofatty replacement of cardiomyocytes, ventricular tachycardia and sudden cardiac death. It is estimated that 70% of all mutations associated with arrhythmogenic right ventricular cardiomyopathy are within the PKP2 gene. These mutations in general appear to disrupt the assembly and stability of desmosomes. Mechanistic studies have shown that certain PKP2 mutations result in instability of the plakophilin-2 protein due to enhanced calpain-mediated degradation.

Specific and sensitive markers of PKP2 and plakoglobin mutation carriers in arrhythmogenic right ventricular cardiomyopathy have been identified to include T-wave inversions, right ventricular wall motion abnormalities, and ventricular extrasystoles. Additionally, immunohistochemical analysis of proteins comprising cardiomyocyte desmosomes has shown to be a highly sensitive and specific diagnostic indicator.

Clinical and genetic characterization of arrhythmogenic right ventricular cardiomyopathy is currently under intense investigation to understand the penetrance associated with PKP2 mutations, as well as other genes encoding desmosomal proteins, in disease progression and outcome.

PKP2 mutations were also found to coexist with sodium channelopathies in patients with Brugada syndrome.

Additionally, plakophilin-2 was found in adherens junctions of cardiac myxomata tumors analyzed, and absent in patients with noncardiac myxomata, suggesting that plakophilin-2 may serve as a valuable marker in the clinical diagnosis of cardiac myxomata.

== Interactions ==
PKP2 has been shown to interact with:

- ankyrin G,
- beta catenin,
- desmocollin 1,
- desmocollin 2,
- desmoglein 1,
- desmoglein 2,
- desmoplakin,
- connexin 43,
- plakoglobin,
- Kir6.2, and
- SCN5A.

== See also ==
- Skin fragility syndrome
