= LX2020 =

Experimental gene therapy

LX2020 is an experimental gene therapy for arrhythmogenic cardiomyopathy caused by mutations to the plakophilin-2 gene. It is delivered via adeno-associated virus and was developed by Lexeo Therapeutics.
