= Desmoglein-2 =

Protein found in humans

DSG2
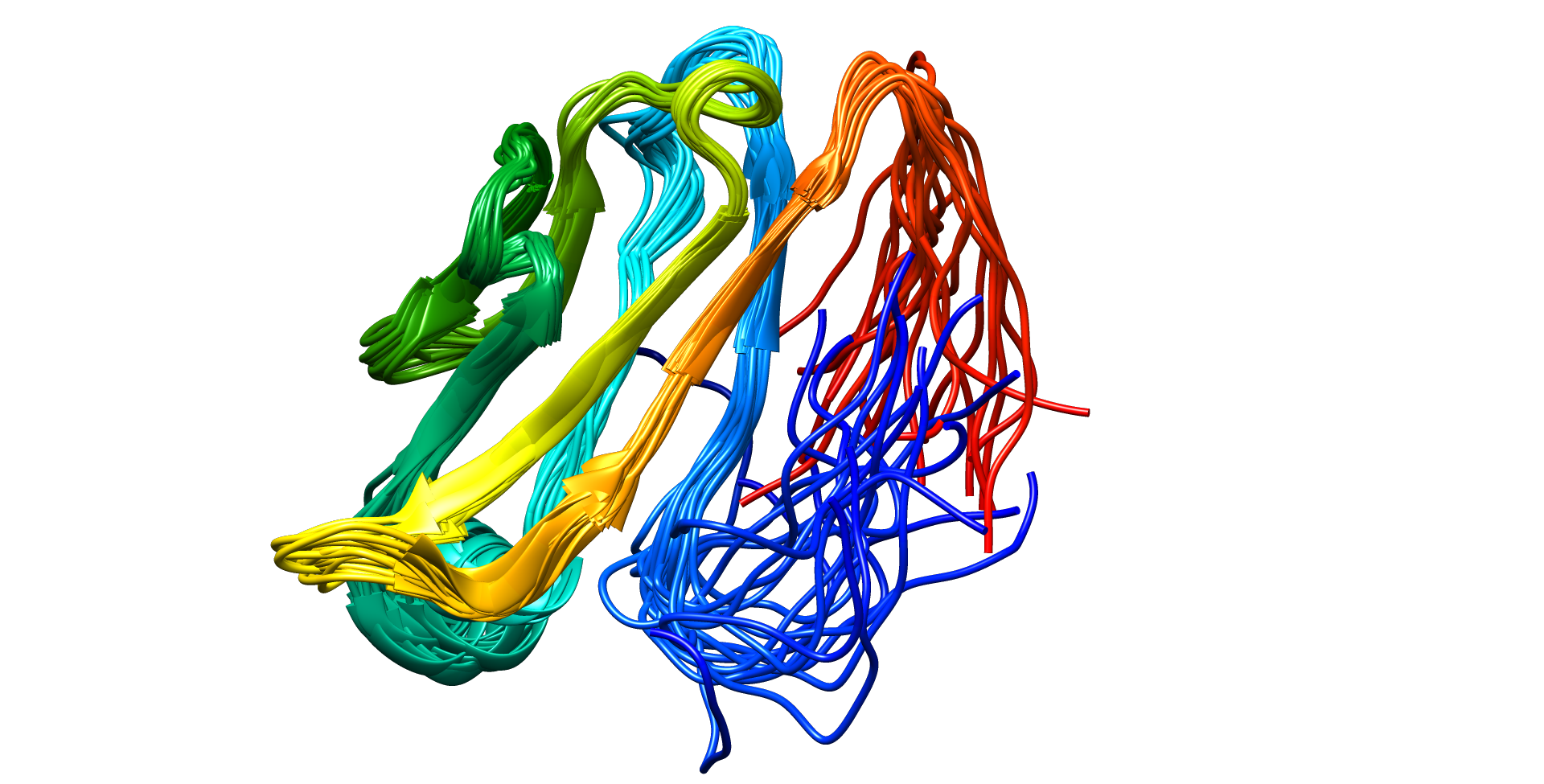

Identifiers
- Aliases: DSG2, ARVC10, ARVD10, CDHF5, CMD1BB, HDGC, desmoglein 2
- External IDs: OMIM: 125671; MGI: 1196466; GeneCards: DSG2
Available structures
PDB	Ortholog search: PDBe RCSB
PDB	List of PDB id codes 2YQG, 5ERD, 5J5J

Gene location (Human)
Chr.	Chromosome 18 (human)
Band	18q12.1	Start	31,498,177 bp
Band	18q12.1	End	31,549,008 bp

Gene location (Mouse)
Chr.	Chromosome 18 (mouse)
Band	18 A2|18 11.42 cM	Start	20,691,131 bp
Band	18 A2|18 11.42 cM	End	20,737,578 bp
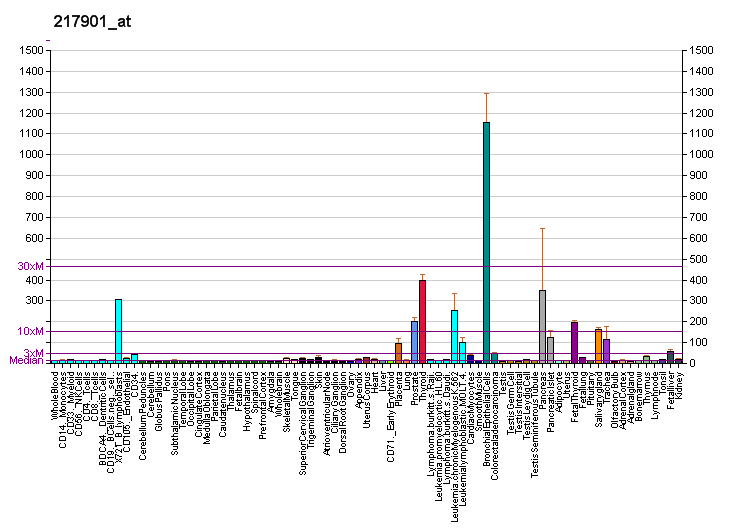
RNA expression pattern
Bgee	Human / Mouse (ortholog); Top expressed in: mucosa of sigmoid colon; jejunal mucosa; palpebral conjunctiva; parotid gland; hair follicle; rectum; lactiferous duct; Epithelium of choroid plexus; duodenum; germinal epithelium / Top expressed in: left colon; transitional epithelium of urinary bladder; parotid gland; epithelium of stomach; Paneth cell; crypt of lieberkuhn of small intestine; lacrimal gland; submandibular gland; pyloric antrum; mucous cell of stomach; More reference expression data
BioGPS	More reference expression data
Gene ontology
Molecular function	calcium ion binding; metal ion binding; cell adhesive protein binding involved in bundle of His cell-Purkinje myocyte communication; cell adhesion molecule binding
Cellular component	integral component of membrane; lateral plasma membrane; membrane; intercalated disc; cell-cell junction; plasma membrane; desmosome; cell surface; cell junction; apical plasma membrane; extracellular exosome; cornified envelope; intracellular membrane-bounded organelle
Biological process	desmosome organization; maternal process involved in female pregnancy; response to progesterone; bundle of His cell-Purkinje myocyte adhesion involved in cell communication; cell adhesion; Purkinje myocyte development; regulation of heart rate by cardiac conduction; regulation of ventricular cardiac muscle cell action potential; homophilic cell adhesion via plasma membrane adhesion molecules; keratinization; cornification; cell-cell adhesion
Sources:Amigo / QuickGO
Orthologs
Databases	NCBI: entry; OMA: entry
Species	Human	Mouse
Entrez	1829	13511
Ensembl	ENSG00000046604	ENSMUSG00000044393
UniProt	Q14126	O55111
RefSeq (mRNA)	NM_001943	NM_007883
RefSeq (protein)	NP_001934	NP_031909
Location (UCSC)	Chr 18: 31.5 – 31.55 Mb	Chr 18: 20.69 – 20.74 Mb
PubMed search
- Wikidata
View/Edit Human	View/Edit Mouse

Desmoglein-2 is a protein that in humans is encoded by the DSG2 gene. Desmoglein-2 is highly expressed in epithelial cells and cardiomyocytes. Desmoglein-2 is localized to desmosome structures at regions of cell-cell contact and functions to structurally adhere adjacent cells together. In cardiac muscle, these regions are specialized regions known as intercalated discs. Mutations in desmoglein-2 have been associated with arrhythmogenic right ventricular cardiomyopathy and familial dilated cardiomyopathy.

== Structure ==
Desmoglein-2 is a 122.2 kDa protein composed of 1118 amino acids. Desmoglein-2 is a calcium-binding transmembrane glycoprotein component of desmosomes in vertebrate cells. Currently, four desmoglein subfamily members have been identified and all are members of the cadherin cell adhesion molecule superfamily. These desmoglein gene family members are located in a cluster on chromosome 18. This second family member, desmoglein-2 is expressed in desmosome-containing tissues, such as cardiac muscle, colon, colon carcinoma, and other simple and stratified epithelial-derived cell lines. Desmoglein-2 is the only desmoglein isoform expressed in cardiomyocytes.

== Function ==
Desmoglein-2 is an integral component of desmosomes, which are cell-cell junctions between epithelial, myocardial, and certain other cell types. Desmogleins and desmocollins connect extracellularly via homophilic and heterophilic interactions. The cytoplasmic tails of desmosomal cadherins bind to plakoglobin and plakophilins, which bind desmoplakin. In cardiac muscle, desmoglein-2 localizes to the intercalated disc, responsible for mechanically and electrically coupling adjacent cardiomyocytes. In vitro studies in HL-1 cardiomyocytes have shown that inhibition of desmoglein-2 binding or mutation of desmoglein-2 protein (Ala517Val or Val920Gly) at cardiac intercalated discs results in a reduced strength of cell-cell contact, demonstrating that desmoglein-2 is critical for cardiomyocyte cohesion.

Studies in transgenic animals have provided insights into desmoglein-2 function. Mice harboring a mutation in DSG-2 in which desmoglein-2 lacked parts of the adhesive extracellular domains were serially examined over time. These mice exhibited white plaque-like lesions in cardiac muscle as early as 2 weeks, displaying a cardiac phenotype by 4 weeks that involved loss of viable cardiomyocytes and heavy cell calcification. Other abnormalities included near to complete dissociation of intercalated discs and inflammation, and eventual arrhythmogenic right ventricular cardiomyopathy with ventricular dilation, fibrosis and cardiac arrhythmia. Studies employing another transgenic mutant DSG2 mouse model harboring an Asn271Ser showed that this mutation caused widening of desmosomes and adherens junctions concomitant with electrophysiologic abnormalities and enhanced susceptibility to cardiac arrhythmias. These changes occurred prior to any cardiomyocyte necrosis or fibrosis. Additionally, it was demonstrated that desmoglein-2 interacts in vivo with the sodium channel protein Na(V)1.5. An additional transgenic model in which desmoglein-2 was knocked out in a cardiac-specific manner showed a loss of adhesive function at intercalated discs in adult animals, albeit normal heart development. In adulthood, 100% of transgenic mutant mice developed chamber dilation, necrosis, aseptic inflammation, fibrosis and conduction defects, as well as modified distribution of connexin-43.

== Clinical significance ==
Mutations in DSG2 have been identified in patients with arrhythmogenic right ventricular cardiomyopathy, along with other desmosomal proteins PKP2 and DSP. Ultrastructural analysis has identified the presence of intercalated disc remodeling in these patients. Additionally, the Val55Met mutation in DSG2 was identified as a novel risk variant for familial dilated cardiomyopathy; patients carrying this mutation exhibited shortened desmosomal structures at cardiac intercalated discs compared to non-diseased patients.

== Interactions ==
Desmoglein-2 has been shown to interact with:

- DSC1
- PKP3
- Plakoglobin and
- SCN5A

== See also ==
- Desmoglein
- List of conditions caused by problems with junctional proteins
