= Desmosome =

Cell junction involved in cell-to-cell adhesion

- A desmosome.

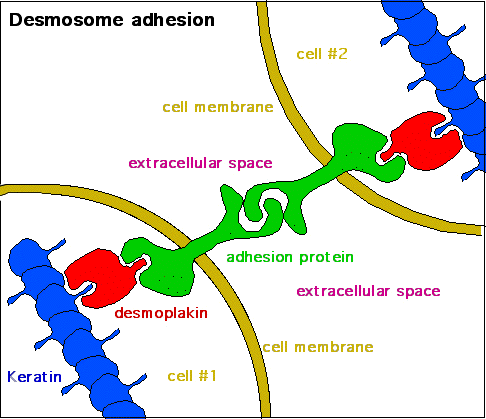
- The extracellular core region containing desmocollin and desmoglein, and the plaque contain desmoplakin, which attaches to keratin intermediate filaments. Desmosome is a intercellular junction in animal cell.

Details

Identifiers
- Latin: Desmosoma; Macula adhaerens
- MeSH: D003896
- TH: H1.00.01.1.02015
- FMA: 67412

A desmosome (/ˈdɛzməˌsoʊm/; "binding body"), also known as a macula adherens (plural: maculae adherentes) (Latin for adhering spot), is a cell structure specialized for cell-to-cell adhesion. A type of junctional complex, they are localized spot-like adhesions randomly arranged on the lateral sides of plasma membranes. Desmosomes are one of the stronger cell-to-cell adhesion types and are found in tissue that experience intense mechanical stress, such as cardiac muscle tissue, bladder tissue, gastrointestinal mucosa, and epithelia.

== Structure ==
Desmosomes are composed of desmosome-intermediate filament complexes (DIFCs), a network of cadherin proteins, linker proteins and intermediate filaments. The DIFCs can be broken into three regions: the extracellular core region ("desmoglea"), the outer dense plaque (ODP), and the inner dense plaque (IDP).

The extracellular core region, approximately 34 nm in length, contains desmoglein and desmocollin, which are in the cadherin family of cell adhesion proteins. Both have five extracellular domains, and have calcium-binding motifs. Extracellular calcium helps form the cadherin adhesion by allowing the cadherin extracellular domain on desmoglein and desmocollin to become rigid. They bind to each other via heterophilic interactions in the extracellular space near their N-termini, in contrast with the homophilic binding characteristic of other cadherins. Desmoglein and desmocollin have a single pass transmembrane region plus an intracellular anchor to secure its position in the cell membrane. Desmogleins and the desmocollin isoform "Dsc-a" contain an intracellular cadherin domain, which binds to plakoglobin.

The outer dense plaque, which is about 15–20 nm in length, contains the intracellular ends of desmocollin and desmoglein, the N-terminus side of desmoplakin, and the armadillo family of mediatory proteins plakoglobin and plakophilin. Armadillo proteins are involved in mediating attachment to intracellular filaments and cell membrane proteins. Armadillo proteins consist of β-catenin, p120-catenin, plakoglobin (γ-catenin), and plakophilins 1-3. In desmosomes, plakoglobin and plakophilin help to anchor desmoplakin and keratin filaments to the desmosome structure. Plakoglobin has 12-arm repeats with a head and tail structure. Plakophilins have 9-arm repeats, and exist in two isoforms: a shorter "a" form and longer "b" form.

The inner dense plaque, also about 15–20 nm in length, contains the C-terminus end of desmoplakin and their attachment to keratin intermediate filaments. Desmoplakin is the most abundant part of the desmosome, as it operates as the mediator between the cadherin proteins in the plasma membrane and the keratin filaments. Desmoplakin has two isoforms that differ in the length of their middle rod domain. All desmoplakins have an N-terminal head, a C-tail consisting of three plakin repeats, and a glycine-serine-arginine rich domain (GSR) at the C-end.

== Clinical significance ==
=== Arrhythmogenic cardiomyopathy ===
Mutations within the desmosome are the main cause of arrhythmogenic cardiomyopathy (ACM), a life-threatening disease caused by mutations usually in desmoglein 2, but sometimes in desmocollin 2. It often afflicts individuals between 20 and 50 years, and has been publicly known as a cause of death in young athletes, although the majority of sudden deaths do not occur in close connection to physical activity. The current incidence within the population is accepted as 1/10,000; however, it is thought that 1/200 may have a mutation that may predispose to ACM. Symptoms of ACM include fainting, shortness of breath, and heart palpitations and the condition is treated by implanting a small defibrillator device.

=== Blisters ===
Blistering diseases such as pemphigus vulgaris (PV) and pemphigus foliaceus (PF) are autoimmune diseases in which auto-antibodies target desmogleins. PV is caused by circulating autoantibodies (IgG) that target Dsg3 (Desmoglein 3) and sometimes Dsg1. PV is manifested by suprabasal acantholysis, or blisters in the mucous membrane and blisters in the epidermis. PF patients have autoantibodies that target Dsg1 with superficial blisters on the epidermis with no mucous membrane issues. Both diseases result in a loss of keratinocyte adhesion. Pemphigus can also be caused by a bacterial infection: bullous impetigo is an infection caused by a staphylococcus bacterium that releases a toxin that cleaves the Dsg1 extracellular domain.

Similar symptoms occur with Hailey–Hailey disease, though the cause is not autoimmune but genetic. A haploinsufficiency of the ATP2C1 gene located on chromosome 3, which encodes the protein hSPCA1, causes malformation of the desmosomes. Desmoglein 1 haploinsufficiency leads to striate palmoplantar keratoderma, a disease which causes extreme thickening of the epidermis. Loss of desmoglein 4 leads to defective hair-follicle differentiation.

Epidermolysis bullosa simplex is an epidermal blistering disease caused by mutations in genes coding for keratin 5 and 14, which attach to desmoplakin. This disease manifests as rupture of the basal epidermis when stress is applied. Ectodermal dysplasia or skin fragility syndrome is caused by plakophilin 1 mutations. This is manifested by detachment of intermediate filaments and desmoplakin from the desmosome.

== History ==
The desmosome was first discovered by Giulio Bizzozero, an Italian pathologist. He named these dense nodules the nodes of Bizzozero. In 1920, the term desmosome was originated by Josef Schaffer. The first combining form, desmo-, Neo-Latin from Greek desmos, bond, carries meaning of binding or bonding things together. Combined with -some, which comes from soma, body, it thus makes a desmosome a binding body.

== See also ==
- Arrhythmogenic right ventricular cardiomyopathy
- Epidermolysis bullosa
- Hemidesmosome
