= VE-cadherin =

Protein-coding gene in the species Homo sapiens

CDH5

Identifiers
- Aliases: CDH5, 7B4, CD144, VE-cadherin, cadherin 5
- External IDs: OMIM: 601120; MGI: 105057; GeneCards: CDH5
Available structures
| PDB | Ortholog search: PDBe RCSB |
| PDB | List of PDB id codes 2KOH |

Gene location (Human)
| Chr. | Chromosome 16 (human) |
| Band | 16q21 | Start | 66,366,622 bp |
| Band | 16q21 | End | 66,404,784 bp |

Gene location (Mouse)
| Chr. | Chromosome 8 (mouse) |
| Band | 8 D3|8 53.04 cM | Start | 104,828,257 bp |
| Band | 8 D3|8 53.04 cM | End | 104,871,143 bp |
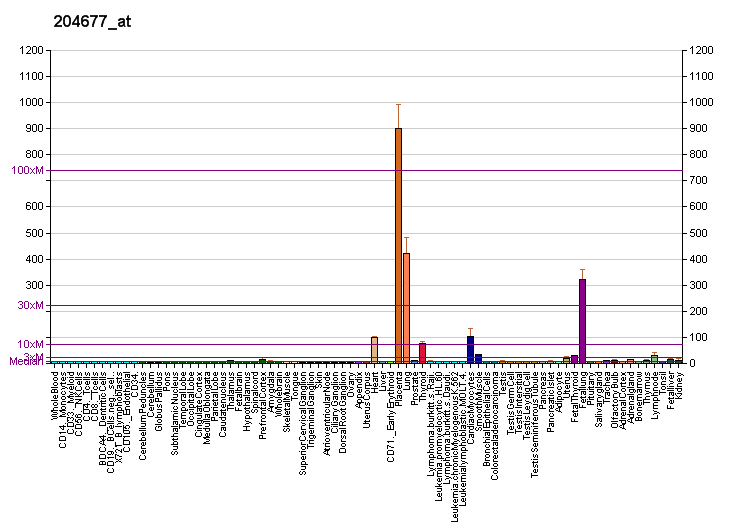
RNA expression pattern
| Bgee | Human / Mouse (ortholog); Top expressed in: right lung; upper lobe of left lung; apex of heart; lower lobe of lung; subcutaneous adipose tissue; placenta; pericardium; vena cava; left ventricle; right lobe of thyroid gland / Top expressed in: gastrula; cardiac muscle tissue of left ventricle; decidua; left lung; interventricular septum; left lung lobe; lactiferous gland; right lung; right lung lobe; extensor digitorum longus muscle; More reference expression data |
| BioGPS | More reference expression data |
Gene ontology
| Molecular function | calcium ion binding; beta-catenin binding; transmembrane transporter binding; metal ion binding; protein binding; protein phosphatase binding; signaling receptor binding; cytoskeletal protein binding; protein homodimerization activity; cadherin binding; vascular endothelial growth factor receptor 2 binding |
| Cellular component | integral component of membrane; membrane; cell-cell junction; bicellular tight junction; adherens junction; cell surface; cell junction; external side of plasma membrane; cell periphery; plasma membrane; catenin complex |
| Biological process | positive regulation of establishment of endothelial barrier; cell adhesion; cell-cell junction assembly; adherens junction organization; transforming growth factor beta receptor signaling pathway; regulation of establishment of cell polarity; negative regulation of cell population proliferation; homophilic cell adhesion via plasma membrane adhesion molecules; blood vessel maturation; cell-cell adhesion; negative regulation of inflammatory response; positive regulation of angiogenesis; calcium-dependent cell-cell adhesion via plasma membrane cell adhesion molecules; cell-cell adhesion mediated by cadherin; cell morphogenesis |
Sources:Amigo / QuickGO
Orthologs
| Databases | NCBI: entry; OMA: entry |
| Species | Human | Mouse |
| Entrez | 1003 | 12562 |
| Ensembl | ENSG00000179776 | ENSMUSG00000031871 |
| UniProt | P33151 | P55284 |
| RefSeq (mRNA) | NM_001114117; NM_001795 | NM_009868 |
| RefSeq (protein) | NP_001786 | NP_033998 |
| Location (UCSC) | Chr 16: 66.37 – 66.4 Mb | Chr 8: 104.83 – 104.87 Mb |
| PubMed search |
- Wikidata
| View/Edit Human | View/Edit Mouse |

Cadherin-5, or VE-cadherin (vascular endothelial cadherin), also known as CD144 (Cluster of Differentiation 144), is a type of cadherin. It is encoded by the human gene CDH5.

== Function ==
VE-cadherin is a classical cadherin from the cadherin superfamily and the gene is located in a six-cadherin cluster in a region on the long arm of chromosome 16 that is involved in loss of heterozygosity events in breast and prostate cancer. The encoded protein is a calcium-dependent cell–cell adhesion glycoprotein composed of five extracellular cadherin repeats, a transmembrane region and a highly conserved cytoplasmic tail. Functioning as a classic cadherin by imparting to cells the ability to adhere in a homophilic manner, the protein may play an important role in endothelial cell biology through control of the cohesion and organization of the intercellular junctions.

Integrity of intercellular junctions is a major determinant of permeability of the endothelium, and the VE-cadherin-based adherens junction is thought to be particularly important. VE-cadherin is known to be required for maintaining a restrictive endothelial barrier – early studies using blocking antibodies to VE-cadherin increased monolayer permeability in cultured cells and resulted in interstitial edema and hemorrhage in vivo. A recent study has shown that TNFAIP3 (A20, a dual-ubiquitin editing enzyme) is essential for stability and expression of VE-cadherin. Deubiquitinase function of A20 was shown to remove ubiquitin chains from VE-cadherin, thereby prevented loss of VE-cadherin expression at the endothelial adherens junctions.

VE-cadherin is indispensable for proper vascular development – there have been two transgenic mouse models of VE-cadherin deficiency, both embryonic lethal due to vascular defects. Further studies using one of these models revealed that although vasculogenesis occurred, nascent vessels collapsed or disassembled in the absence of VE-cadherin. Therefore, it was concluded that VE-cadherin serves the purpose of maintaining newly formed vessels.

== Interactions ==
VE-cadherin has been shown to interact with:

- Beta-catenin
- Plakoglobin
- PTPRB
- Catenin (cadherin-associated protein), alpha 1
- CTNND1
- PTPmu (PTPRM)
- PTPrho (PTPRT)

== As a biomarker ==
VE-cadherin may serve as a biomarker for radiation exposure.

== See also ==
- Vasculogenic Mimicry
