= PTPRT =

Protein-coding gene in the species Homo sapiens

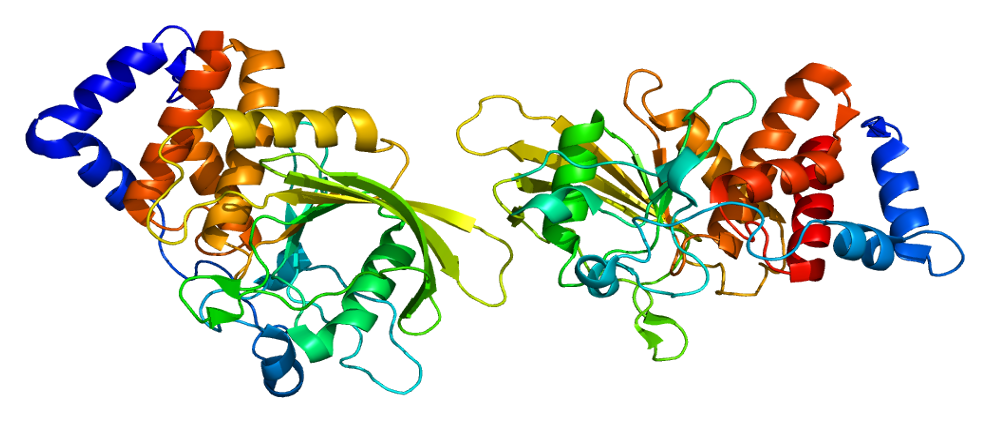

Identifiers
- Aliases: PTPRT, RPTPrho, protein tyrosine phosphatase, receptor type T, protein tyrosine phosphatase receptor type T, RPTP-rho, R-PTP-T
- External IDs: OMIM: 608712; MGI: 1321152; GeneCards: PTPRT
Available structures
PDB	Ortholog search: PDBe RCSB
PDB	List of PDB id codes 2OOQ
Enzyme activity
EC #	BRENDA	ExPASy	KEGG	MetaCyc
3.1.3.48	↗	↗	↗	↗

Gene location (Human)
Chr.	Chromosome 20 (human)
Band	20q12-q13.11	Start	42,072,752 bp
Band	20q12-q13.11	End	43,189,970 bp

Gene location (Mouse)
Chr.	Chromosome 2 (mouse)
Band	2 H2|2 81.91 cM	Start	161,363,910 bp
Band	2 H2|2 81.91 cM	End	162,503,067 bp
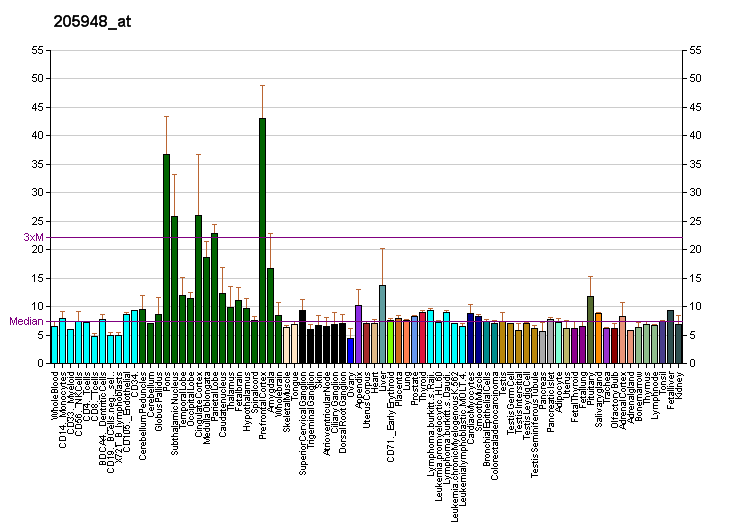
RNA expression pattern
Bgee	Human / Mouse (ortholog); Top expressed in: Brodmann area 10; middle temporal gyrus; Brodmann area 23; frontal pole; superior frontal gyrus; Brodmann area 46; primary visual cortex; orbitofrontal cortex; postcentral gyrus; dorsolateral prefrontal cortex / Top expressed in: piriform cortex; nucleus of stria terminalis; central gray substance of midbrain; lumbar spinal ganglion; superior frontal gyrus; superior colliculus; olfactory bulb; primary visual cortex; dorsal tegmental nucleus; dentate gyrus of hippocampal formation granule cell; More reference expression data
BioGPS	More reference expression data
Gene ontology
Molecular function	protein tyrosine phosphatase activity; phosphatase activity; beta-catenin binding; protein binding; phosphoprotein phosphatase activity; hydrolase activity; alpha-catenin binding; cadherin binding; delta-catenin binding; gamma-catenin binding; transmembrane receptor protein tyrosine phosphatase activity; protein phosphatase binding; protein homodimerization activity; STAT family protein binding
Cellular component	integral component of membrane; cell surface; plasma membrane; membrane; integral component of plasma membrane
Biological process	protein dephosphorylation; cell adhesion; signal transduction; homophilic cell adhesion via plasma membrane adhesion molecules; transmembrane receptor protein tyrosine kinase signaling pathway; dephosphorylation; peptidyl-tyrosine dephosphorylation; negative regulation of cell migration; cellular response to interleukin-6; negative regulation of receptor signaling pathway via STAT; peptidyl-tyrosine dephosphorylation involved in inactivation of protein kinase activity
Sources:Amigo / QuickGO
Orthologs
Databases	NCBI: entry; OMA: entry
Species	Human	Mouse
Entrez	11122	19281
Ensembl	ENSG00000196090	ENSMUSG00000053141
UniProt	O14522	Q99M80
RefSeq (mRNA)	NM_007050; NM_133170; NM_001394024; NM_001394025; NM_001394026	NM_001291149; NM_001291150; NM_001291151; NM_021464
RefSeq (protein)	NP_008981; NP_573400	NP_001278078; NP_001278079; NP_001278080; NP_067439
Location (UCSC)	Chr 20: 42.07 – 43.19 Mb	Chr 2: 161.36 – 162.5 Mb
PubMed search
- Wikidata
View/Edit Human	View/Edit Mouse

Receptor-type tyrosine-protein phosphatase T is an enzyme that in humans is encoded by the PTPRT gene.

PTPRT is also known as PTPrho, PTPρ and human accelerated region 9. The human accelerated regions are 49 regions of the human genome that are conserved among vertebrates, but in humans show significant distinction from other vertebrates. This region may, therefore, have played a key role in differentiating humans from apes.

== Function ==
The protein encoded by this gene is a member of the protein tyrosine phosphatase (PTP) family. PTPs are known to be signaling molecules that regulate a variety of cellular processes including cell growth, differentiation, mitotic cycle, and oncogenic transformation. PTPrho has been proposed to function during development of the nervous system and as a tumor suppressor in cancer.

== Structure ==
This PTP possesses an extracellular region, a single transmembrane region, and two tandem intracellular catalytic domains, and thus represents a receptor-type PTP (RPTP). The extracellular region contains a meprin-A5 antigen-PTPmu (MAM) domain, one Ig-like domain and four fibronectin type III-like repeats. PTPrho is a member of the type R2B subfamily of RPTPs, which also includes the RPTPs PTPmu (PTPRM), PTPkappa (PTPRK), and PCP-2 (PTPRU). Comparison of R2B cDNA sequences identified that PTPmu is most closely related to PTPrho. PTPrho is alternatively spliced. Alternative splicing of exons 14, 16, and 22a have been described for PTPrho (PTPRT). Two alternatively spliced transcript variants of this gene, which encode distinct proteins, have been reported. The first isoform encodes the larger version of the protein. The second variant lacks a region of the extracellular domain between the fourth FNIII domain and the transmembrane domain and in the juxtamembrane domain.

== Homophilic binding ==
PTPrho protein mediates homophilic cell-cell adhesion, meaning that when it interacts with a like molecule on an adjacent cell it induces the cells to bind or adhere to one another. PTPrho does not bind to other subfamily members to mediate cell-cell aggregation, similar to other type R2B subfamily members.

The MAM domain, Ig domain and all four fibronectin III domain of PTPrho are necessary for cell-cell aggregation. PTPrho is the most frequently mutated RPTP in colon, lung, skin and stomach cancers. Many of the mutations observed in cancer occur in the extracellular domain of PTPrho, suggesting that defective cell-cell aggregation may contribute to the tumorigenicity of these mutations. When PTPrho proteins are engineered with the different point mutations observed in cancer and then are expressed in non-adherent Sf9 cells, these cells do not mediate comparable levels of cell-cell aggregation to wild-type PTPrho, demonstrating that the mutations observed in cancer are loss of function mutations.

== Tyrosine phosphatase activity ==
The first catalytic domain of Type R2B RPTPs is considered the active phosphatase domain, whereas the second phosphatase domain is thought to be inactive. Mutations in the second phosphatase domain of PTPrho, however, result in a reduction of phosphatase activity of PTPrho. Deletion of the second tyrosine phosphatase domain in colorectal cancer cells also reduces PTPrho catalytic activity, again demonstrating that the second phosphatase domain of PTPrho does regulate catalytic activity, either directly or indirectly.

Catalytic activity of PTPrho may also be regulated by tyrosine phosphorylation of the wedge domain of the first tyrosine phosphatase domain on tyrosine 912 by Fyn tyrosine kinase. Tyrosine phosphorylation of Y912 results in increased multimerization of PTPrho, likely in cis, with other PTPrho molecules. Based on crystal structure analysis and modeling, the phosphorylated wedge domain is hypothesized to insert into the catalytic domain of a neighboring PTPrho molecule, thus inactivating it. This mechanism has also been proposed to regulate the catalytic activity of RPTPalpha. The crystal structures of PTPmu and LAR suggest a different mechanism for the regulation of their catalytic activity, as these RPTPs are in an open and active conformation when dimerized.

== Regulation of gene expression ==
Evaluation of the 5'untranslated regions of PTPrho (PTPRT) cDNA indicate a number of transcription factor binding site consensus sequences, including those for AP-2, c-Myb, NF-1, sox-5, and Sp-1, Oct-1, CdxA, C/EBP, En-1, GATA-1, GATA-2, GKLF, HoxA3, Ik-2, Msx-1, Pax-4 and SRY.

(RE1-silencing transcription factor) (REST) is a transcription repressor that binds to REST DNA recognition element (RE-1) in 5'UTRs. A screen of single nucleotide polymorphic genetic changes within the REST binding regions of DNA sequences revealed a polymorphism in the RE-1 of PTPrho (PTPRT). This SNP would result in less REST repressor activity, which could lead to increased expression of PTPrho (PTPRT) in cells that harbored this SNP.

== Expression and function in cancer ==
PTPrho is the most frequently mutated RPTP in colon, lung, skin and stomach cancers. Evaluation of the cytoplasmic mutations observed in PTPrho in cancer demonstrate that they all reduce catalytic activity, even the mutations located in the second catalytic domain. The frequency of mutations in the cytoplasmic tyrosine phosphatase domain of PTPrho in cancer has been disputed. The PTPrho (PTPRT) promoter was observed to be hypermethylated in colorectal cancer compared to controls, suggesting another mechanism whereby PTPrho function may be reduced in cancer, in this instance by epigenetic silencing.

PTPrho is also upregulated in estrogen receptor alpha positive breast tumor samples versus estrogen receptor alpha negative tumor samples. The authors evaluated 560 selected genes by real-time quantitative reverse transcription-polymerase chain reaction (RT-PCR) in estrogen receptor alpha positive tissue and compared it to estrogen receptor alpha negative tissue, and found that PTPrho(PTPRT) was upregulated in the estrogen receptor alpha tissue, suggesting a non-tumor suppressor role for PTPrho.

== Expression and function in the developing nervous system ==
PTPrho (PTPRT) mRNA is expressed in the developing nervous system. Its expression is first observed in stage 25 in Xenopus embryos in the developing optic vesicles and in nascent motor and interneurons of the spinal cord. At stage 35/36, PTPrho (PTPRT) expression is found in the outer nuclear, or photoreceptor, layer, and in the inner nuclear layer (INL) of the neural retina. The level of PTPrho (PTPRT) transcript decreases in the photoreceptors and increases in the INL, and by stage 41, is restricted to the INL only. PTPrho (PTPRT) transcripts have also been observed in the developing cortex and olfactory bulbs.

PTPrho (PTPRT) is expressed in a very specific subset of neurons in the postnatal cerebellar cortex, the granule cell layer. Specifically, PTPrho (PTPRT) was expressed in postmigratory granule cells of lobules 1 to 6 of the cerebellum.

In adults, PTPrho protein is exclusively expressed in the central nervous system and localizes to synapses between neurons. Over-expression of wild-type and catalytically inactive mutant forms of PTPrho result in an increase in the number of excitatory and inhibitory synapses in cultured neurons in vitro. Knock-down of PTPrho expression decreases the number of synapses in cultured neurons. PTPrho interacts in cis with the extracellular domains of neuroligins and neurexins at synapses. PTPrho is phosphorylated on tyrosine 912 in the wedge region of its first catalytic domain by Fyn tyrosine kinase. Phosphorylation at this site attenuates synapse formation in cultured neurons. When PTPrho is phosphorylated by Fyn, PTPrho appears to form homophilic multimerizations, likely in cis, which appear to decrease PTPrho association with neuroligins and neurexins. The reduction of cis interactions with neuroligins and neurexons is hypothesized to ultimately lead to the reduction in synapse formation.

PTPrho activity has also been demonstrated to be required for the development of neuronal dendrites. It was found to regulate dendritic arborization by dephosphorylating tyrosine 177 of Breakpoint cluster region protein (BCR).

== Substrates ==
PTPrho associates with members of the cadherin and catenin family of cell adhesion molecules as demonstrated by GST-fusion protein pull-down assays using brain homogenate. Using this technique, the authors identified that PTPrho interacts with alpha-actinin, alpha-catenin, beta-catenin, gamma-catenin/plakoglobin, p120 catenin, desmoglein, E-cadherin, N-cadherin, and VE-cadherin. Purified wild-type PTPrho GST fusion protein was able to dephosphorylate E-cadherin and p120catenin co-immunoprecipitated from a pancreatic beta cell line, MIN6-m9. This suggests that these proteins are PTPrho substrates.

PTPrho also dephosphorylates BCR protein. The ability of PTPrho to dephosphorylate BCR was shown to have functional consequences for the normal development of neuronal dendritic arborization.

PTPrho dephosphorylates STAT3, signal transducer and activator of transcription 3, on tyrosine 705, a residue that is critical for the activation of STAT3. Dephosphorylation by PTPrho in colorectal cancer cells results in a reduction in the total level of transcription of the STAT3 target genes, Bcl-XL and SOCS3. Likewise, expression of wild-type PTPrho decreases the ability of STAT3 to translocate to the nucleus, where it needs to localize to function as a transcription factor.

PTPrho also dephosphorylates paxillin on tyrosine 88. Higher levels of tyrosine 88 phosphorylation of paxillin are observed in colon cancers. When colon cancer cells are engineered to express a mutant form of paxillin that is incapable of being tyrosine phosphorylated, the paxillin Y88F mutant, these cells exhibit reduced tumorigenicity. This suggests that PTPrho may function as a tumor suppressor protein by regulating paxillin phosphorylation.

== Interacting proteins ==
PTPrho has been shown to interact with:

- alpha-actinin
- Alpha-catenin
- Beta-catenin
- Breakpoint cluster region protein (BCR)
- Desmoglein
- E-cadherin
- Fyn
- N-cadherin
- gamma-catenin
- p120-catenin
- Paxillin
- Neuroligin
- Neurexin
- STAT3
- VE-cadherin/Cadherin-5
