= Δ-Catenin =

Protein family

catenin (cadherin-associated protein), delta 1

Identifiers
- Symbol: CTNND1
- Alt. symbols: CTNND
- NCBI gene: 1500
- HGNC: 2515
- OMIM: 601045
- RefSeq: NM_001331
- UniProt: O60716

Other data
- Locus: Chr. 11 q12.1
Search for
- Structures: Swiss-model
- Domains: InterPro

catenin (cadherin-associated protein), delta 2 (neural plakophilin-related arm-repeat protein)

Identifiers
- Symbol: CTNND2
- NCBI gene: 1501
- HGNC: 2516
- OMIM: 604275
- RefSeq: NM_001332
- UniProt: Q9UQB3

Other data
- Locus: Chr. 5 p15.2
Search for
- Structures: Swiss-model
- Domains: InterPro

δ-Catenin is a subfamily of catenin proteins with ten armadillo-repeats and includes the proteins catenin delta-1 and catenin delta-2. Catenin delta-2 is expressed in the brain where it is important for normal cognitive development. Like β-catenin and γ-catenin, δ-catenins seem to interact with presenilins. These catenin-presenilin interaction have implications for cadherin function and regulation of cell-to-cell adhesion.

While β-catenin acts as a transcription regulatory protein in the Wnt/TCF pathway, delta-1 catenin has been implicated as a regulator of the NF-κB transcription factor.

Palmitoylation of δ-catenin seems to coordinate activity-dependent changes in synaptic adhesion molecules, synapse structure, and receptor localizations that are involved in memory formation.

== See also ==
- Catenin
- CTNND1
