= Catenin =

Type of protein

Interactions of structural proteins at a cadherin-based adherens junction. The exact means by which cadherins are linked to actin filaments is still under investigation.

Catenins are a family of proteins found in complexes with cadherin cell adhesion molecules of animal cells. The first two catenins that were identified became known as α-catenin and β-catenin. α-Catenin can bind to β-catenin and can also bind filamentous actin (F-actin). β-Catenin binds directly to the cytoplasmic tail of classical cadherins. Additional catenins such as γ-catenin and δ-catenin have been identified. The name "catenin" was originally selected ('catena' means 'chain' in Latin) because it was suspected that catenins might link cadherins to the cytoskeleton.

== Types ==
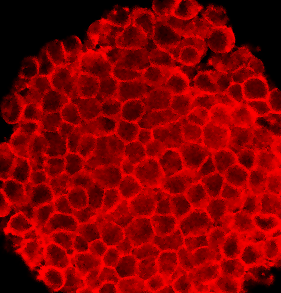
Figure 1. β-catenin at cell-to-cell contacts of P19 embryonal carcinoma cells.

- α-catenin
- β-catenin
- γ-catenin
- δ-catenin

All but α-catenin contain armadillo repeats. They exhibit a high degree of protein dynamics, alone or in complex.

== Function ==
Several types of catenins work with N-cadherins to play an important role in learning and memory.

Cell-cell adhesion complexes are required for simple epithelia in higher organisms to maintain structure, function and polarity. These complexes, which help regulate cell growth in addition to creating and maintaining epithelial layers, are known as adherens junctions and they typically include at least cadherin, β-catenin, and α-catenin. Catenins play roles in cellular organization and polarity long before the development and incorporation of Wnt signaling pathways and cadherins.

The primary mechanical role of catenins is to connect cadherins to actin filaments, such as the adhesion junctions of epithelial cells. Most studies investigating catenin actions have focused on α-catenin and β-catenin. β-catenin is particularly interesting as it plays a dual role in the cell. First of all, by binding to cadherin receptor intracellular cytoplasmic tail domains, it can act as an integral component of a protein complex in adherens junctions that helps cells maintain epithelial layers. β-catenin acts by anchoring the actin cytoskeleton to the junctions, and may possibly aid in contact inhibition signaling within the cell. For instance, when an epithelial layer is complete and the adherens junctions indicate that the cell is surrounded, β-catenin may play a role in telling the cell to stop proliferating, as there is no room for more cells in the area. Secondly, β-catenin participates in the Wnt signaling pathway as a downstream target. While the pathway is very detailed and not completely understood, in general, when Wnt is not present, GSK-3B (a member of the pathway) is able to phosphorylate β-catenin as a result of a complex formation that includes β-catenin, AXIN1, AXIN2, APC (a tumor suppressor gene product), CSNK1A1, and GSK3B. Following phosphorylation of the N-terminal Ser and Thr residues of β-catenin, BTRC promotes its ubiquitination, which causes it to be degraded by the TrCP/SKP complex. On the other hand, when Wnt is present, GSK-3B is displaced from the previously mentioned complex, causing β-catenin to not be phosphorylated, and thus not ubiquitinated. As a result, its levels in the cell are stabilized as it builds up in the cytoplasm. Eventually, some of this accumulated β-catenin will move into the nucleus with the help of Rac1. At this point, β-catenin becomes a coactivator for TCF and LEF to activate Wnt genes by displacing Groucho and HDAC transcription repressors. These gene products are important in determining cell fates during normal development and in maintaining homeostasis, or they can lead to de-regulated growth in disorders like cancer by responding to mutations in β-catenin, APC or Axin, each of which can lead to this de-regulated β-catenin level stabilization in cells.

While less attention is directed at α-catenin in studies involving cell adhesion, it is nonetheless an important player in cellular organization, function and growth. α-catenin participates in the formation and stabilization of adherens junctions by binding to β-catenin-cadherin complexes in the cell. The exact mechanisms by which α-catenin acts in adherens junctions is still unclear; however, it is likely that α-catenin acts in concert with vinculin to bind to actin and help stabilize the junctions.

=== Interaction with cadherins ===
F9 embryonal carcinoma cells are similar to the P19 cells shown in Figure 1 and normally have cell-to-cell adhesion mediated by E-cadherin with β-catenin bound to the cytoplasmic domain of E-cadherin. F9 cells were genetically engineered to lack β-catenin, resulting in increased association of plakoglobin with E-cadherin. In F9 cells lacking both β-catenin and plakoglobin, very little E-cadherin and α-catenin accumulated at the cell surface. Mice lacking β-catenin have defective embryos. Mice engineered to specifically have vascular endothelium cells deficient in β-catenin showed disrupted adhesion between vascular endothelial cells. Mice lacking plakoglobin have cell adhesion defects in many tissues, although β-catenin substitutes for plakoglobin at many cellular junctions. Keratinocytes engineered to not express alpha-catenin have disrupted cell adhesion and activated NF-κB. A tumor cell line with defective δ-catenin, low levels of E-cadherin and poor cell-to-cell adhesion could be restored to normal epithelial morphology and increased E-cadherin levels by expression of normal levels of functional δ-catenin.

== Clinical significance ==
As previously mentioned, the same properties of catenin that give it an important role in normal cell fate determination, homeostasis and growth, also make it susceptible to alterations that can lead to abnormal cell behavior and growth. Any changes in cytoskeletal organization and adhesion can lead to altered signaling, migration and a loss of contact inhibition that can promote cancer development and tumor formation. In particular, catenins have been identified to be major players in aberrant epithelial cell layer growth associated with various types of cancer. Mutations in genes encoding these proteins can lead to inactivation of cadherin cell adhesions and elimination of contact inhibition, allowing cells to proliferate and migrate, thus promoting tumorigenesis and cancer development. Catenins are known to be associated with colorectal and ovarian cancer, and they have been identified in pilomatrixoma, medulloblastoma, pleomorphic adenomas, and malignant mesothelioma.

While less is known about the exact mechanism of α-catenin, its presence in cancer is widely felt. Through the interaction of β-catenin and α-catenin, actin and E-cadherin are linked, providing the cell with a means of stable cell adhesion. However, decreases in this adhesion ability of the cell has been linked to metastasis and tumor progression. In normal cells, α-catenin may act as a tumor suppressor and can help prevent the adhesion defects associated with cancer. On the other hand, a lack of α-catenin can promote aberrant transcription, which can lead to cancer. As a result, it can be concluded, that cancers are most often associated with decreased levels of α-catenin.

β-catenin also likely plays a significant role in various forms of cancer development. However, in contrast to α-catenin, heightened β-catenin levels may be associated with carcinogenesis. In particular, abnormal interactions between epithelial cells and the extracellular matrix are associated with the over-expression of these β-catenins and their relationship with cadherins in some cancers. Stimulation of the Wnt/β-catenin pathway, and its role in promoting malignant tumor formations and metastases, has also been implicated in cancers.

The role of catenin in epithelial-mesenchymal transition (or EMT) has also received a lot of recent attention for its contributions to cancer development. It has been shown that HIF-1α can induce the EMT pathway, as well as the Wnt/β-catenin signaling pathway, thus enhancing the invasive potential of LNCaP cells (human prostate cancer cells). As a result, it is possible that the EMT associated with upregulated HIF-1α is controlled by signals from this Wnt/β-catenin pathway. Catenin and EMT interactions may also play a role in hepatocellular carcinoma. VEGF-B treatment of hepatoma carcinoma cells can cause α-catenin to move from its normal location on the membrane into the nucleus and E-cadherin expression to decrease, thus promoting EMT and tumor invasiveness.

There are other physiological factors that are associated with cancer development through their interactions with catenins. For instance, higher levels of collagen XXIII have been associated with higher levels of catenins in cells. These heightened levels of collagen helped facilitate adhesions and anchorage-independent cell growth and provided evidence of collagen XXIII's role in mediating metastasis. In another example, Wnt/β-catenin signaling has been identified as activating microRNA-181s in hepatocellular carcinoma that play a role in its tumorigenesis.

=== Recent clinical studies ===
Recently, there have been a number of studies in the lab and in the clinic investigating new possible therapies for cancers associated with catenin. Integrin antagonists and immunochemotherapy with 5-fluorouracil plus polysaccharide-K have shown promising results. Polysaccharide K can promote apoptosis by inhibiting NF-κB activation, which is normally up-regulated, and inhibiting apoptosis, when β-catenin levels are increased in cancer. Therefore, using polysaccharide K to inhibit NF-κB activation can be used to treat patients with high β-catenin levels.

In the short-term, combining current treatment techniques with therapeutics targeting catenin-associated elements of cancer might be most effective in treating the disease. By disrupting Wnt/β-catenin signaling pathways, short-term neoadjuvant radiotherapy (STNR) may help prevent clinical recurrence of the disease after surgery, but much more work is needed before an adequate treatment based on this concept can be determined.

Lab studies have also implicated potential therapeutic targets for future clinical studies. VEGFR-1 and EMT mediators may be ideal targets for preventing cancer development and metastasis. 5-aminosalicylate (ASA) has been shown to reduce β-catenin and its localization to the nucleus in colon cancer cells isolated from and in patients. As a result, it may be useful as a chemopreventative agent for colorectal cancer. Additionally, acyl hydrazones have been shown to inhibit the Wnt signaling characteristic of many cancers by destabilizing β-catenin, thus disrupting Wnt signaling and preventing the aberrant cell growth associated with cancer. On the other hand, some treatment concepts involve upregulating the E-cadherin/catenin adhesion system to prevent disruptions in adhesions and contact inhibition from promoting cancer metastasis. One possible way to achieve this, which has been successful in mouse models, is to use inhibitors of Ras activation in order to enhance the functionality of these adhesion systems. Other catenin, cadherin or cell cycle regulators may also be useful in treating a variety of cancers.

While recent studies in the lab and in the clinic have provided promising results for treating various catenin-associated cancers, the Wnt/β-catenin pathway may make finding a single correct therapeutic target difficult as the pathway has been shown to elicit a variety of different actions and functions, some of which may possibly even prove to be anti-oncogenic.

=== Catenins and cancer ===
Summary:

- Associated Cancers: colorectal and ovarian cancer; pilomatrixoma; medulloblastoma; pleomorphic adenomas; malignant mesothelioma; glioblastomas.
- Mutations in catenin genes can cause loss of contact inhibition that can promote cancer development and tumor formation.
- Mutations associated with aberrant epithelial cell layer growth due to lack of adhesions and contact inhibition
- Down-regulated levels of α-catenin
- Up-regulated levels of β-catenin
- Stimulation of the Wnt/β-catenin pathway
- Catenin alteration (and Wnt/β-catenin pathway up-regulation) may help stimulate epithelial-mesenchymal transition (or EMT)
- Mutations or aberrant regulation of catenins may also associate with other factors that promote metastasis and tumorigenesis
- Treatments focus on correcting aberrant catenin levels or regulating catenin pathways that are associated with cancer development and progression
