= Lethal acantholytic epidermolysis bullosa =

- This condition is inherited in an autosomal recessive manner.
- Specialty: Dermatology

Lethal acantholytic epidermolysis bullosa is a fatal genetic skin disorder caused by mutations in DSP

== See also ==
- Desmoplakin
- List of conditions caused by problems with junctional proteins
- Epidermolysis bullosa
