= DSC2 =

Protein-coding gene in humans

Identifiers
- Aliases: DSC2, ARVD11, CDHF2, DG2, DGII/III, DSC3, desmocollin 2
- External IDs: OMIM: 125645; MGI: 103221; GeneCards: DSC2
Available structures
PDB	Ortholog search: PDBe RCSB
PDB	List of PDB id codes 5J5J, 5ERP

Gene location (Human)
Chr.	Chromosome 18 (human)
Band	18q12.1	Start	31,058,840 bp
Band	18q12.1	End	31,102,522 bp

Gene location (Mouse)
Chr.	Chromosome 18 (mouse)
Band	18 A2|18 11.14 cM	Start	20,163,690 bp
Band	18 A2|18 11.14 cM	End	20,192,611 bp
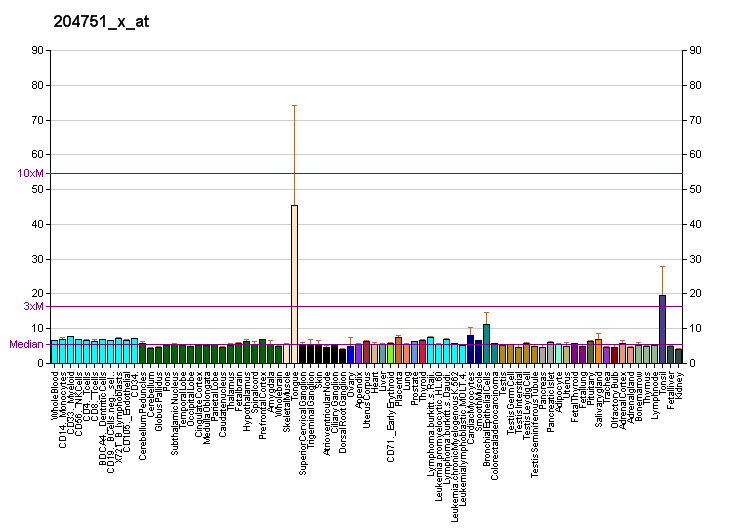

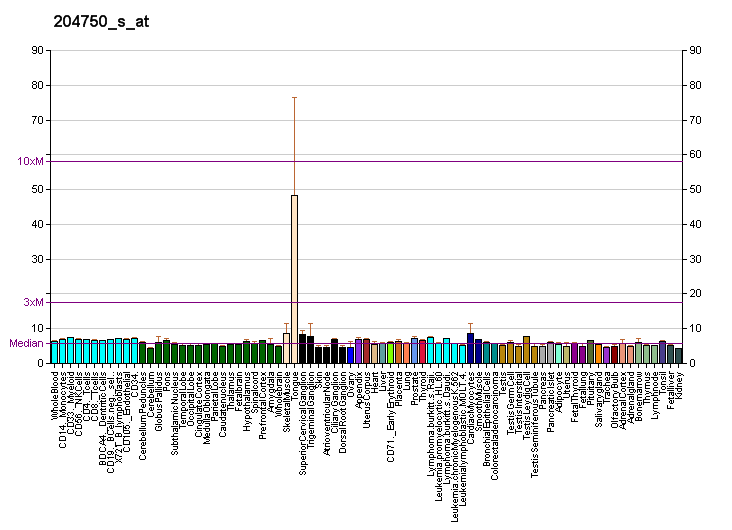
RNA expression pattern
Bgee	Human / Mouse (ortholog); Top expressed in: gingival epithelium; oral cavity; mucosa of pharynx; mucosa of sigmoid colon; jejunal mucosa; body of tongue; human penis; vulva; parotid gland; amniotic fluid / Top expressed in: conjunctival fornix; corneal stroma; epithelium of stomach; esophagus; pyloric antrum; mucous cell of stomach; cervix; ileum; jejunum; left colon; More reference expression data
BioGPS	More reference expression data
Gene ontology
Molecular function	cell adhesive protein binding involved in bundle of His cell-Purkinje myocyte communication; calcium ion binding; protein binding; metal ion binding
Cellular component	integral component of membrane; cell junction; desmosome; extracellular exosome; cytoplasmic vesicle; membrane; intercalated disc; cornified envelope; plasma membrane; cell-cell junction
Biological process	cellular response to starvation; cell adhesion; bundle of His cell-Purkinje myocyte adhesion involved in cell communication; regulation of heart rate by cardiac conduction; regulation of ventricular cardiac muscle cell action potential; homophilic cell adhesion via plasma membrane adhesion molecules; cardiac muscle cell-cardiac muscle cell adhesion; keratinization; cornification; cell-cell adhesion
Sources:Amigo / QuickGO
Orthologs
Databases	NCBI: entry; OMA: entry
Species	Human	Mouse
Entrez	1824	13506
Ensembl	ENSG00000134755	ENSMUSG00000024331
UniProt	Q02487	P55292
RefSeq (mRNA)	NM_004949; NM_024422	NM_013505; NM_001317363; NM_001317365
RefSeq (protein)	NP_004940; NP_077740	NP_001304292; NP_001304294; NP_038533
Location (UCSC)	Chr 18: 31.06 – 31.1 Mb	Chr 18: 20.16 – 20.19 Mb
PubMed search
- Wikidata
View/Edit Human	View/Edit Mouse

Desmocollin-2 is a protein that in humans is encoded by the DSC2 gene. Desmocollin-2 is a cadherin-type protein that functions to link adjacent cells together in specialized regions known as desmosomes. Desmocollin-2 is widely expressed, and is the only desmocollin isoform expressed in cardiac muscle, where it localizes to intercalated discs. Mutations in DSC2 have been causally linked to arrhythmogenic right ventricular cardiomyopathy.

== Structure ==
Desmocollin-2 is a calcium-dependent glycoprotein that is a member of the desmocollin subfamily of the cadherin superfamily. Three different posttranslational modifications (N-Glycosylations, O-Mannosylations and disulfide bridges) were present in the extracellular domain of desmocollin-2. The desmocollin family members are arranged as closely linked genes on human chromosome 18q12.1. Human DSC2 consists of greater than 32 kb of DNA and has 17 exons, with exon 16 being alternatively spliced and encoding distinct isoforms. Desmocollin-2 contains five N-terminal extracellular domains, a transmembrane-spanning domain, and a C-terminal cytoplasmic tail. Desmocollin-2 binds to desmoglein family members through a calcium-dependent interaction with its extracellular domains, and to plakoglobin through its cytoplasmic tail. Desmocollin-2 is ubiquitously expressed in desmosomal tissues, such as skin epithelia, and is the only desmocollin isoform expressed in human cardiac muscle, where it localizes to desmosomes within intercalated discs.

== Function ==
Desmosomal cadherins, including the desmocollin family members and desmogleins, are found at desmosome cell-cell junctions and are required for cell adhesion and desmosome formation via interactions with their extracellular cadherin regions. Desmosomes function to anchor intermediate filaments at sites of strong adhesion, which undergo high mechanical stress, such as in cardiac muscle. Desmocollins are integral components to desmosomes and studies have shown that in addition to tensile strength, desmocollins also function as molecular sensors and facilitators of signal transduction. Studies in zebrafish expressing a mutant desmocollin-2 have shed light on its function in the myocardium as a pivotal component for normal myocardial structure and function. Knockdown of desmcollin-2 caused malformations in desmosomal plaques and bradycardia, dilation of the ventricular chamber and reduced fractional shortening.

== Clinical Significance ==
Mutations in DSC2 are associated with arrhythmogenic right ventricular cardiomyopathy (ARVC), including mutations with a recessive inheritance. Mutations in DSC2 as well as other desmosomal genes are frequent in patients with advanced dilated cardiomyopathy that are undergoing cardiac transplantation.

Hallmark features of ARVC include enlargement of the right ventricle, replacement of right ventricular cardiomyocytes with fibrofatty deposits, electrocardiographic abnormalities, and arrhythmias. Biopsies from patients with ARVC consistently show abnormalities in intercalated discs, with decreased numbers of desmosomes and widening of intercellular gaps between adjacent cardiomyocytes, suggesting that this disease is a disease of intercalated discs. Studies investigating two heterozygous DSC2 mutations have shown that certain mutations in the N-terminal region can modify the subcellular localization of desmocollin-2 from the desmosomal plaque to the cytoplasm.

== Interactions ==
Desmocollin-2 has been shown to interact with:

- DSG2
- JUP

== Animal Models ==
- Transgenic mice with cardiac specific overexpression of desmocollin-2 develop severe cardiomyopathy.
