= Fascia adherens =

Part of cardiac muscle

Details

Identifiers
- Latin: Fascia adherens
- TH: H1.00.01.1.02014
- FMA: 67410

In the anatomy of the cardiac muscle, a fascia adherens also known as an adhesive strip is one of the ribbon-like structures that stabilize non-epithelial tissue. They are similar in function and structure to the zonula adherens or adherens junction of epithelial cells. It is a broad intercellular junction in the transversal sections of an intercalated disc of cardiac muscle anchoring actin filaments. It helps to transmit contractile forces.

== See also ==
- Fascia
