= Plakophilin =

Cytoskeleton proteins

Plakophilin are proteins of the cytoskeleton. They are involved in regulating the adhesive activity of cadherin.

The three types of plakophilin proteins found in humans are PKP1, PKP2, and PKP3; all exhibiting dual localization in the nucleus as well as desmosomes.

Genes include:

- PKP1
- PKP2
- PKP3

== See also ==
- List of conditions caused by problems with junctional proteins
