= Anchor cell =

The anchor cell is a cell in nematodes such as Caenorhabditis elegans. It is important in the development of the reproductive system, as it is required for the production of the tube of cells that allows embryos to pass from the uterus through the vulva to the outside of the worm.

During the development of C. elegans hermaphrodites, the anchor cell produces a signalling molecule (LIN-3/EGF) that induces nearby epidermal cells to develop into the vulva. The anchor cell also produces another signal (the Notch ligand LAG-2) that induces adjacent uterine cells to become the π cells, some of which will later connect the uterus to the vulva. The anchor cell next removes the basement membrane that separates the uterus and vulva and invades, initiating the connection between the uterus and the vulva. Finally the anchor cell fuses with eight of the π cells to form the uterine seam cell.
