= Desmoplakin =

Protein found in humans

DSP
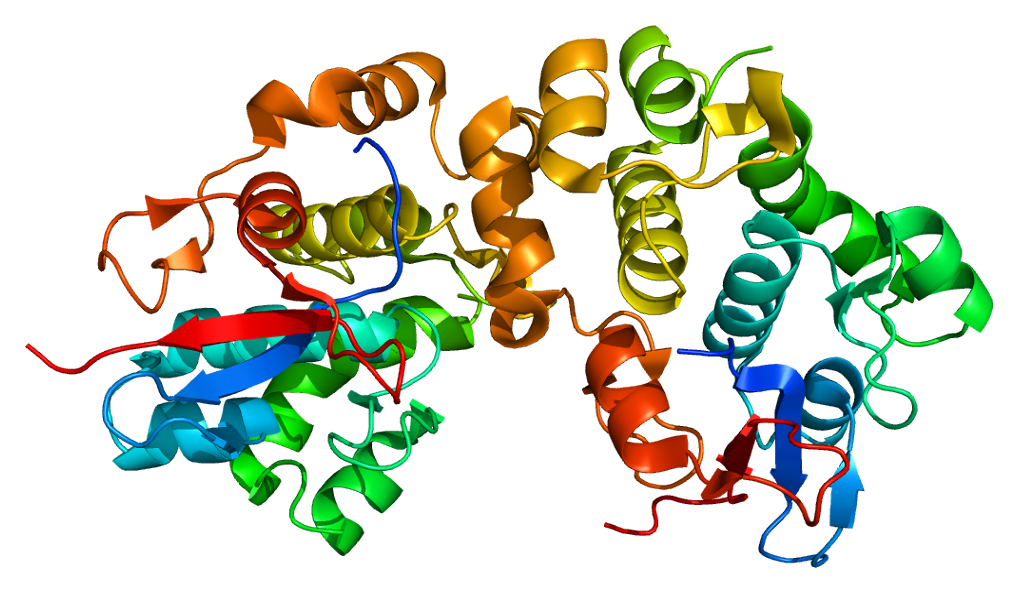

Identifiers
- Aliases: DSP, DCWHKTA, DP, DPI, DPII, desmoplakin
- External IDs: OMIM: 125647; MGI: 109611; GeneCards: DSP
Available structures
PDB	Ortholog search: PDBe RCSB
PDB	List of PDB id codes 3R6N, 1LM5, 1LM7, 5DZZ

Gene location (Human)
Chr.	Chromosome 6 (human)
Band	6p24.3	Start	7,541,617 bp
Band	6p24.3	End	7,586,714 bp

Gene location (Mouse)
Chr.	Chromosome 13 (mouse)
Band	13|13 A3.3	Start	38,335,270 bp
Band	13|13 A3.3	End	38,382,553 bp
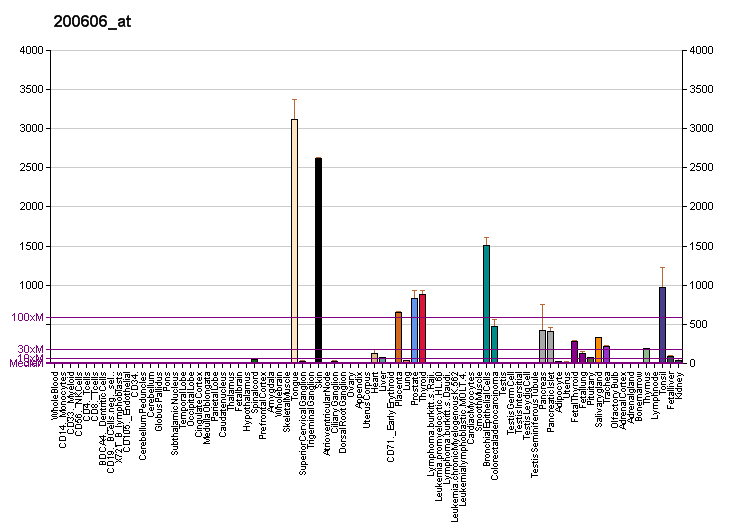
RNA expression pattern
Bgee	Human / Mouse (ortholog); Top expressed in: skin of hip; skin of thigh; hair follicle; gingival epithelium; human penis; vulva; skin of arm; oral cavity; nipple; mucosa of pharynx / Top expressed in: conjunctival fornix; skin of external ear; corneal stroma; epidermis; hair follicle; skin of back; ascending aorta; myocardium of ventricle; aortic valve; cardiac muscle tissue of left ventricle; More reference expression data
BioGPS	More reference expression data
Gene ontology
Molecular function	protein-macromolecule adaptor activity; scaffold protein binding; structural molecule activity; structural constituent of cytoskeleton; protein binding; cell adhesive protein binding involved in bundle of His cell-Purkinje myocyte communication; cell adhesion molecule binding; protein kinase C binding; RNA binding
Cellular component	cytoplasm; membrane; intercalated disc; cell-cell junction; plasma membrane; desmosome; cell junction; basolateral plasma membrane; fascia adherens; extracellular exosome; cytoskeleton; intermediate filament; nucleus; extracellular matrix; cornified envelope; ficolin-1-rich granule membrane
Biological process	intermediate filament organization; desmosome organization; ventricular compact myocardium morphogenesis; wound healing; bundle of His cell-Purkinje myocyte adhesion involved in cell communication; keratinocyte differentiation; peptide cross-linking; protein localization to adherens junction; epidermis development; intermediate filament cytoskeleton organization; adherens junction organization; regulation of heart rate by cardiac conduction; regulation of ventricular cardiac muscle cell action potential; skin development; keratinization; neutrophil degranulation; cornification; cell-cell adhesion
Sources:Amigo / QuickGO
Orthologs
Databases	NCBI: entry; OMA: entry
Species	Human	Mouse
Entrez	1832	109620
Ensembl	ENSG00000096696	ENSMUSG00000054889
UniProt	P15924	E9Q557
RefSeq (mRNA)	NM_001008844; NM_004415; NM_001319034	NM_023842
RefSeq (protein)	NP_001008844; NP_001305963; NP_004406	NP_076331
Location (UCSC)	Chr 6: 7.54 – 7.59 Mb	Chr 13: 38.34 – 38.38 Mb
PubMed search
- Wikidata
View/Edit Human	View/Edit Mouse

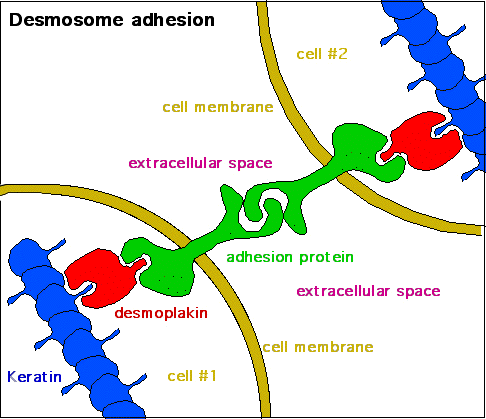
Cell adhesion in desmosomes

Desmoplakin is a protein in humans that is encoded by the DSP gene. Desmoplakin is a critical component of desmosome structures in cardiac muscle and epidermal cells, which function to maintain the structural integrity at adjacent cell contacts. In cardiac muscle, desmoplakin is localized to intercalated discs which mechanically couple cardiac cells to function in a coordinated syncytial structure. Mutations in desmoplakin have been shown to play a role in dilated cardiomyopathy and arrhythmogenic right ventricular cardiomyopathy, where it may present with acute myocardial injury; striate palmoplantar keratoderma, Carvajal syndrome and paraneoplastic pemphigus.

== Structure ==
Desmoplakin exists as two predominant isoforms; the first, known as "DPII", has molecular weight 260.0 kDa (2272 amino acids) and the second, known as "DPI", has molecular weight 332.0 kDa (2871 amino acids). These isoforms are identical except for the shorter rod domain in DPII. DPI is the predominant isoform expressed in cardiac muscle. The DSP gene is located on chromosome 6p24.3, containing 24 exons and spanning approximately 45 kDa of genomic DNA. Desmoplakin is a large desmosomal plaque protein that homodimerizes and adopts a dumbbell-shaped conformation. The N-terminal globular head domain of desmoplakin is composed of a series of alpha helical bundles, and is required for both the localization to the desmosome and interaction with the N-terminal region of plakophilin 1 and plakoglobin as well as desmocollin and desmoglein. This is further sub divided into a region called the "Plakin domain" made up of six spectrin repeat domains separated by SH3 domain. A crystal structure of part of the plakin domain has been resolved, while the entire plakin domain has been elucidated using small angle X-ray scattering which revealed a non-linear structure, an unexpected result considering spectrin repeats are observed in linear orientations. The C-terminal region of desmoplakin is composed of three plakin repeat domains, termed A, B and C, which are essential for coalignment and binding of intermediate filaments. Located at the most distal C-terminus of desmoplakin is a region rich in glycine–serine–arginine; it has been demonstrated that serine phosphorylation of this domain may modify desmoplakin-intermediate filament interactions. In the mid-region of desmoplakin, a coiled-coil rod domain is responsible for homodimerization.

== Function ==
Desmosomes are intercellular junctions that tightly link adjacent cells. Desmoplakin is an obligate component of functional desmosomes that anchors intermediate filaments to desmosomal plaques. In cardiomyocytes, desmoplakin forms desmosomal plaques with the intermediate filament desmin, whereas in endothelial cells cytokeratin type intermediate filaments are recruited, and vimentin in arachnoid and follicular dendritic cell types. Both types of intermediate filaments attach in a lateral fashion to desmoplakin to form the plaque. In cardiac muscle, desmoplakin is localized to desmosomes in intercalated discs. Desmoplakin isoform DPI is highly expressed and is thought to play a role in both the assembly and stabilization of desmosomes; its role is critical, as desmoplakin knockout mice display embryonic lethality. In mice overexpressing a C-terminal mutated desmoplakin protein, desmoplakin binding to desmin is disrupted in cardiac muscle and hearts display abnormal intercalated disc formation and structure. Much has been learned regarding desmoplakin function from mutations in patients with arrhythmogenic right ventricular cardiomyopathy, where mutations in specific binding domains alter desmoplakin binding to plakoglobin or desmin and result in cell death and dysfunction.

== Clinical significance ==
Mutations in this gene are the cause of several cardiomyopathies, including dilated cardiomyopathy and arrhythmogenic right ventricular cardiomyopathy. The presence of pathogenic mutations in this gene has been associated with episodes of acute myocardial injury, which may mimic episodes of myocarditis. Mutations in DSP have also been associated with striate palmoplantar keratoderma. Carvajal syndrome results from an autosomal recessive mutation of a frameshift (7901delG) in DSP that results in a combination of above conditions, including dilated cardiomyopathy, keratoderma and woolly hair. Patients with Carvajal syndrome often suffer from heart failure in teenage years. A case of compound heterozygosity for two DSP nonsense mutations resulting in lethal acantholytic epidermolysis bullosa has been reported. Autoantibodies to DSP are a hallmark of the autoimmune disease paraneoplastic pemphigus. Decreased desmoplakin expression has been found in patients with oropharyngeal cancer and breast cancer, which may alter cell-cell adhesion properties and propagate metastasis.

== Interactions ==
Desmoplakin has been shown to interact with:

- Desmin,
- Keratin 1,
- PKP1
- PKP2,
- Plakoglobin, and
- Vimentin.

== See also ==
- List of target antigens in pemphigus
- List of conditions caused by problems with junctional proteins
