= Plakoglobin =

Mammalian protein found in Homo sapiens

JUP

Identifiers
- Aliases: JUP, ARVD12, CTNNG, DP3, DPIII, PDGB, PKGB, Plakoglobin, junction plakoglobin, PG
- External IDs: OMIM: 173325; MGI: 96650; GeneCards: JUP
Available structures
| PDB | Ortholog search: PDBe RCSB |
| PDB | List of PDB id codes 3IFQ |

Gene location (Human)
| Chr. | Chromosome 17 (human) |
| Band | 17q21.2 | Start | 41,754,604 bp |
| Band | 17q21.2 | End | 41,786,931 bp |

Gene location (Mouse)
| Chr. | Chromosome 11 (mouse) |
| Band | 11 D|11 63.47 cM | Start | 100,259,784 bp |
| Band | 11 D|11 63.47 cM | End | 100,288,589 bp |
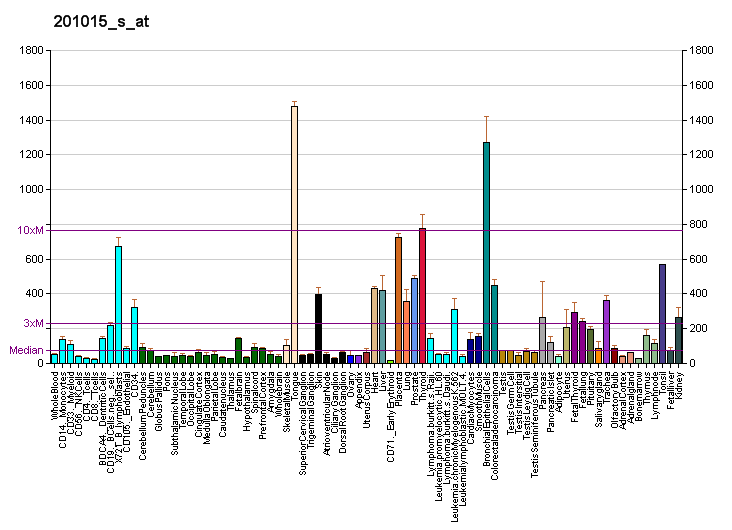
RNA expression pattern
| Bgee | Human / Mouse (ortholog); Top expressed in: skin of leg; skin of abdomen; mucosa of pharynx; nipple; gingival epithelium; skin of arm; human penis; vulva; skin of thigh; apex of heart / Top expressed in: lip; esophagus; corneal stroma; skin of back; muscle of thigh; skin of external ear; stomach; pyloric antrum; epithelium of stomach; yolk sac; More reference expression data |
| BioGPS | More reference expression data |
Gene ontology
| Molecular function | protein homodimerization activity; transcription coactivator activity; structural constituent of cell wall; structural molecule activity; signal transducer activity; protein binding; cell adhesive protein binding involved in bundle of His cell-Purkinje myocyte communication; protein phosphatase binding; protein kinase binding; alpha-catenin binding; cell adhesion molecule binding; cadherin binding |
| Cellular component | cytoplasm; cytosol; gamma-catenin-TCF7L2 complex; lateral plasma membrane; membrane; intercalated disc; cell-cell junction; focal adhesion; adherens junction; plasma membrane; desmosome; hemidesmosome; cell junction; apicolateral plasma membrane; protein-DNA complex; Z discdkac; actin cytoskeleton; zonula adherens; cytoplasmic side of plasma membrane; catenin complex; fascia adherens; cytoskeleton; intermediate filament; extracellular exosome; nucleus; extracellular matrix; cornified envelope; extracellular region; specific granule lumen; ficolin-1-rich granule lumen |
| Biological process | adherens junction assembly; protein heterooligomerization; positive regulation of canonical Wnt signaling pathway; positive regulation of DNA-binding transcription factor activity; bundle of His cell-Purkinje myocyte adhesion involved in cell communication; endothelial cell-cell adhesion; cellular response to indole-3-methanol; desmosome assembly; cell adhesion; regulation of cell population proliferation; detection of mechanical stimulus; positive regulation of protein import into nucleus; adherens junction organization; regulation of heart rate by cardiac conduction; cell migration; regulation of ventricular cardiac muscle cell action potential; skin development; signal transduction; keratinization; neutrophil degranulation; cornification; protein localization to plasma membrane; cell-cell adhesion; positive regulation of cell-matrix adhesion; negative regulation of blood vessel endothelial cell migration; positive regulation of angiogenesis; positive regulation of transcription by RNA polymerase II |
Sources:Amigo / QuickGO
Orthologs
| Databases | NCBI: entry; OMA: entry |
| Species | Human | Mouse |
| Entrez | 3728 | 16480 |
| Ensembl | ENSG00000173801 | ENSMUSG00000001552 |
| UniProt | P14923 | Q02257 |
| RefSeq (mRNA) | NM_002230; NM_021991; NM_001352773; NM_001352774; NM_001352775 NM_001352776; NM_001352777 | NM_010593 |
| RefSeq (protein) | NP_002221; NP_068831; NP_001339702; NP_001339703; NP_001339704 NP_001339705; NP_001339706 | NP_034723 |
| Location (UCSC) | Chr 17: 41.75 – 41.79 Mb | Chr 11: 100.26 – 100.29 Mb |
| PubMed search |
- Wikidata
| View/Edit Human | View/Edit Mouse |

Plakoglobin, also known as junction plakoglobin or gamma-catenin, is a protein that in humans is encoded by the JUP gene. Plakoglobin is a member of the catenin protein family and homologous to β-catenin. Plakoglobin is a cytoplasmic component of desmosomes and adherens junctions structures located within intercalated discs of cardiac muscle that function to anchor sarcomeres and join adjacent cells in cardiac muscle. Mutations in plakoglobin are associated with arrhythmogenic right ventricular dysplasia.

== Structure ==
Human plakoglobin is 81.7 kDa in molecular weight and 745 amino acids long. The JUP gene contains 13 exons spanning 17 kb on chromosome 17q21. Plakoglobin is a member of the catenin family, since it contains a distinct repeating amino acid motif called the armadillo repeat. Plakoglobin is highly similar to β-catenin; both have 12 armadillo repeats as well as N-terminal and C-terminal globular domains of unknown structure. Plakoglobin was originally identified as a component of desmosomes, where it can bind to the cadherin family member desmoglein I. Plakoglobin also associates with classical cadherins such as E-cadherin; in that context, it was called gamma-catenin. Plakoglobin forms distinct complexes with cadherins and desmosomal cadherins.

== Function ==
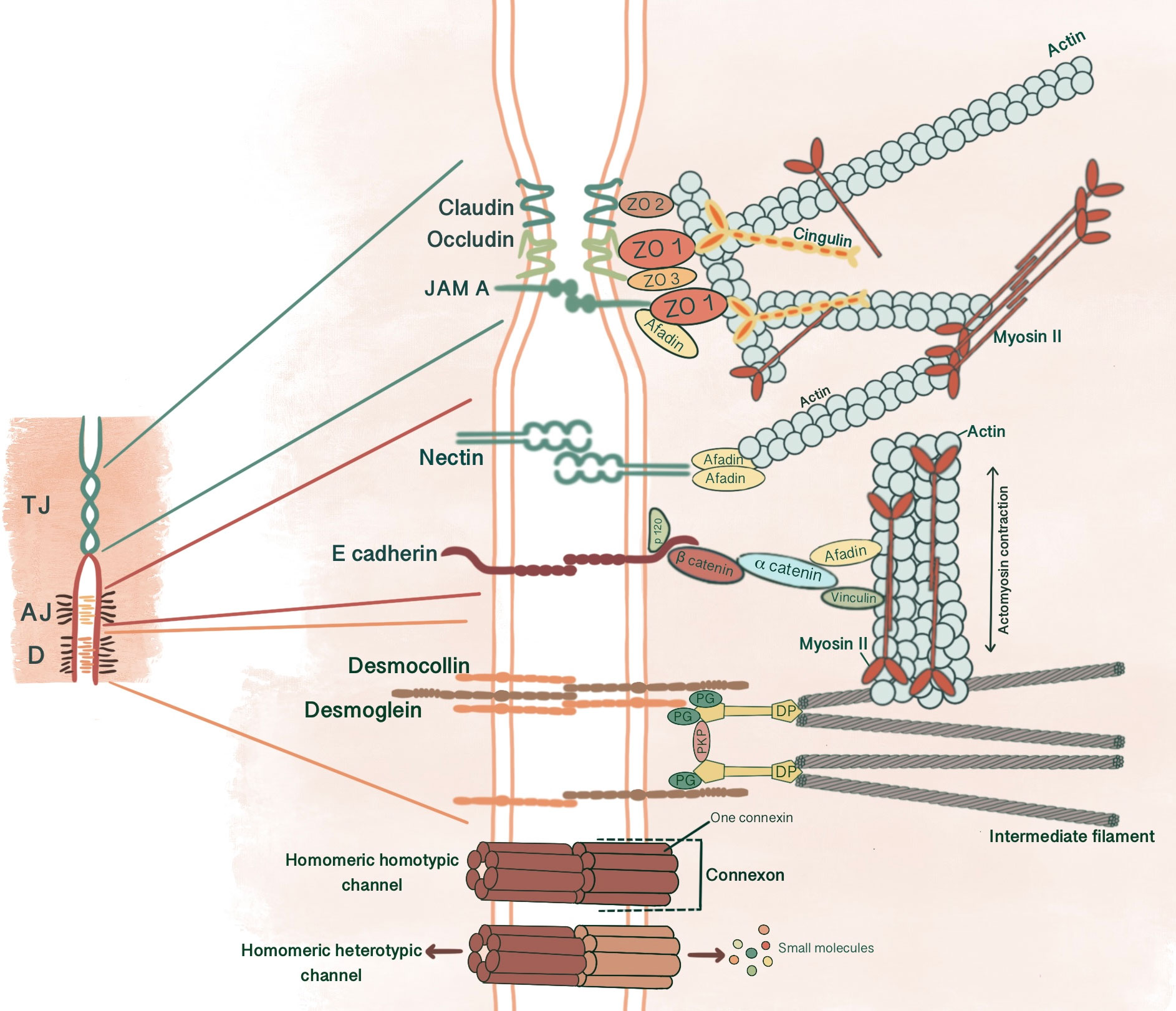
Simplified scheme of cell junctions. TJ, Tight junctions; AJ, Adherens junctions; D, Desmosomes; ZO, Zonula occludens; PG, Plakoglobin, PKP, Plakophilin; DP, Desmoplakin

Plakoglobin is a major cytoplasmic component of both desmosomes and adherens junctions, and is the only known constituent common to submembranous plaques in both of these structures, which are located at the intercalated disc (ICD) of cardiomyocytes. Plakoglobin links cadherins to the actin cytoskeleton. Plakoglobin binds to conserved regions of desmoglein and desmocollin at intracellular catenin-binding sites to assemble desmosomes.

Plakoglobin is essential for normal development of intercalated discs and stability of cardiac muscle. Transgenic mice homozygous for a null mutation of the JUP gene die around embryonic day 12 from substantial defects in adherens junctions and a lack of functional desmosomes in the heart. Further studies showed that cardiac fibers obtained from JUP-null embryonic mice had decreased passive compliance albeit normal attachment of sarcomeres to adherens junctions.

In additional studies, an inducible cardiac-specific plakoglobin knockout mice were generated. Transgenic mice displayed a similar phenotype as arrhythmogenic right ventricular cardiomyopathy patients, with loss of cardiomyocytes, fibrosis and cardiac dysfunction, as well as alterations in desmosome protein content and gap junction remodeling. Hearts also exhibited increases in β-catenin signaling. Further investigations on the role of β-catenin and plakoglobin in the heart generated a double knockout of these two proteins. Mice exhibited cardiomyopathy, fibrosis, conduction abnormalities and sudden cardiac death, presumably via spontaneous lethal ventricular arrhythmias. Mice also showed a decrease in gap junction structures at intercalated discs.

Intracellular plakoglobin expression is controlled by Wnt signaling and ubiquitin-proteasome-dependent degradation. Phosphorylation of N-terminal Serines by a “destruction complex” composed of glycogen synthase kinase 3β (GSK3β) and scaffold proteins adenomatous polyposis coli (APC) and axin targets plakoglobin for degradation.[31–33]. The phosphorylated motif is recognized by β-TrCP, a ubiquitin ligase that targets plakoglobin 26S proteasome-dependent degradation. Plakoglobin is also O-glycosylated near its N-terminal destruction box.

== Clinical significance ==
Mutation of the JUP gene encoding plakoglobin has been implicated as one of the causes of the cardiomyopathy known as arrhythmogenic right ventricular dysplasia (ARVD) or arrhythmogenic right ventricular cardiomyopathy; mutations in JUP specifically causes an autosomal recessive form referred to as Naxos disease. This form of was first identified in a small cluster of families on the Greek island of Naxos. The phenotype of the Naxos disease variant of ARVD is unique in that it involves the hair and skin as well as the right ventricle. Affected individuals have kinky, wooly hair; there is also palmar and plantar erythema at birth that progresses to keratosis as the palms and soles of the feet are used in crawling and walking. These findings co-segregate 100% with the development of ARVD by early adolescence.

It has become clear that ARVD/ARVC is a disease of the cardiac muscle desmosome; advances in molecular genetics have illuminated this notion.

Studies investigating the role of plakoglobin in disease pathology have found that suppression of desmoplakin expression by siRNA led to the nuclear localization of plakoglobin, resulting in a reduction in Wnt signaling via Tcf/Lef1 and ensued pathogenesis of ARVC. Specifically, adipogenic factor expression was induced and cardiac progenitor cells at the epicardium were differentiated to adipocytes.

Non-invasive cardiac screening identified T-wave inversion, abnormalities in right ventricular wall motion, and frequent ventricular extrasystoles as sensitive and specific markers of a JUP mutation. Additional studies have shown that immunohistochemical analysis of cardiac muscle desmosomal proteins is also a sensitive and specific diagnostic text for ARVD/ARVC.

Abnormal distribution of plakoglobin due to mutations in genes encoding for Desmoglein 1 and 3 have also been implicated in Pemphigus vulgaris.

== Interactions ==
Plakoglobin has been shown to interact with:

- APC,
- CTNNA1,
- CTNNB1,
- CDH1,
- CDH2,
- CDH3,
- CDH5,
- DSG2,
- DSP,
- MUC1,
- PKP2,
- PTPkappa (PTPRK),
- PTPrho (PTPRT), and
- PDLIM3.

== See also ==
- Catenin
- List of conditions caused by problems with junctional proteins
