= Arrhythmogenic cardiomyopathy =

- Other names: Arrhythmogenic right ventricular cardiomyopathy (ARVC), arrhythmogenic right ventricular dysplasia (ARVD)
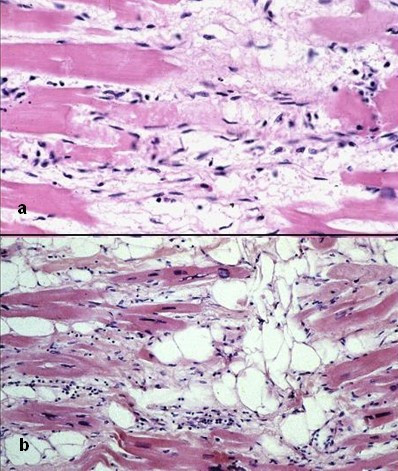
- Typical micro-histologic features of ARVC/D. Ongoing myocyte death (upper) with early fibrosis and adipocyte infiltration (lower).
- Specialty: Cardiology
- Frequency: 0.03%

Arrhythmogenic cardiomyopathy (ACM) is an inherited heart disease.

ACM is caused by genetic defects of parts of the cardiac muscle known as desmosomes, areas on the surface of muscle cells which link them together. The desmosomes are composed of several proteins, and many of those proteins can have harmful mutations.

ARVC can also develop in intense endurance athletes in the absence of desmosomal abnormalities. Exercise-induced ARVC is possibly a result of excessive right ventricular wall stress during high intensity exercise.

The disease is a type of non-ischemic cardiomyopathy that primarily involves the right ventricle, though cases of exclusive left ventricular disease have been reported. It is characterized by hypokinetic areas involving the free wall of the ventricle, with fibrofatty replacement of the myocardium, with associated arrhythmias often originating in the right ventricle. The nomenclature ARVD is currently thought to be inappropriate and misleading as ACM does not involve dysplasia of the ventricular wall. Cases of ACM originating from the left ventricle led to the abandonment of the name ARVC.

ACM can be found in association with diffuse palmoplantar keratoderma, and woolly hair, in an autosomal recessive condition called Naxos disease, because this genetic abnormality can also affect the integrity of the superficial layers of the skin most exposed to pressure stress.

ACM is an important cause of ventricular arrhythmias in children and young adults. It is seen predominantly in males, and 30–50% of cases have a familial distribution.

== Signs and symptoms ==
Those affected by arrhythmogenic cardiomyopathy may not have any symptoms at all despite having significant abnormalities in the structure of their hearts. If symptoms do occur, the initial presentation is often due to abnormal heart rhythms (arrhythmias) which in arrhythmogenic cardiomyopathy may take the form of palpitations, or blackouts. Sudden death may be the first presentation of ACM without any preceding symptoms. These symptoms often occur during adolescence and early adulthood, but signs of ACM may rarely be seen in infants.

As ACM progresses, the muscle tissue within the ventricles may dilate and weaken. The right ventricle typically weakens first, leading to fatigue and ankle swelling. In the later stages of the disease in which both ventricles are involved shortness of breath may develop, especially when lying flat.

== Causes ==
=== Genetics ===
ACM is usually inherited in an autosomal dominant pattern, with variable expression. Only 30% to 50% of individuals affected by ACM will test positive to one of the known genetic mutations in chromosomal loci associated with the disease. Novel studies showed that mutations (point mutations) in genes encoding for desmosomal proteins (see intercalated disc) are the main causatives for the development of this disease. Recently it has been shown, that mutations in the desmin DES gene could cause ACM. Desmin is an intermediate filament protein, which is linked to the desmosomes. Different DES mutations cause an abnormal aggregation of desmin and associated proteins. The penetrance is 20–35% in general, but significantly higher in Italy. Seven gene loci have been implicated in ACM. It is unclear whether the pathogenesis varies with the different loci involved. Standard genetic screening test are currently tested and evaluated in different state of the art cardiovascular research centres and hospitals. Types include:

Type	OMIM	Gene	Locus	Reference
ARVD1lpl	107970	TGFB3	14q23-q24	
ARVD2	600996	RYR2	1q42-q43	
ARVD3	602086	?	14q12-q22	
ARVD4	602087	?	2q32.1-q32.3	
ARVD5	604400	TMEM43	3p23	
ARVD6	604401	?	10p14-p12	
ARVD7	609160	DES	10q22.3	
ARVD8	607450	DSP	6p24	
ARVD9	609040	PKP2	12p11	
ARVD10	610193	DSG2	18q12.1-q12	
ARVD11	610476	DSC2	18q12.1	
ARVD12	611528	JUP	17q21	
		ILK	11p15.4	
		LMNA		

=== Exercise-induced ARVC ===
In recent years, several studies have found that excessive long-term sports activity can cause exercise-induced arrhythmogenic right ventricular cardiomyopathy (EIARVC). For some athletes ARVC might develop due to high-endurance exercise and it most often develops without an underlying desmosomal abnormalities. This could possibly be a result of excessive right ventricular (RV) wall stress during very high volumes of training, which is known to be causing a disproportionate remodeling of RV.

In a 2003 study, 46 endurance athletes, mostly cyclists, presented with various symptoms suggestive of arrhythmia of RV origin. 59% of participants tested met the criteria for ARVC, and another 30% for possible ARVC. Only 1 athlete of the group had a family history of hereditary ARVC.

Exercise-induced ARVC and athlete's heart have overlapping features.

== Pathogenesis ==
The pathogenesis of ACM is largely unknown. Apoptosis (programmed cell death) appears to play a large role. It was previously thought that only the right ventricle is involved, but recent cohorts have shown many cases of left ventricular disease and biventricular disease. The disease process starts in the subepicardial region and works its way towards the endocardial surface, leading to transmural involvement (possibly accounting for the aneurysmal dilatation of the ventricles). Residual myocardium is confined to the subendocardial region and the trabeculae of the ventricles. These trabeculae may become hypertrophied.

Aneurysmal dilatation is seen in 50% of cases at autopsy. It usually occurs in the diaphragmatic, apical, and infundibular regions (known as the triangle of dysplasia). The left ventricle is involved in 50–67% of individuals. If the left ventricle is involved, it is usually late in the course of disease, and confers a poor prognosis.

There are two pathological patterns seen in ACM, Fatty infiltration and fibro-fatty infiltration.

=== Fatty infiltration ===
At first, fatty infiltration, is confined to the right ventricle. This involves a partial or near-complete substitution of myocardium with fatty tissue without wall thinning. It involves predominantly the apical and infundibular regions of the RV. The left ventricle and ventricular septum are usually spared. No inflammatory infiltrates are seen in fatty infiltration. There is evidence of myocyte (myocardial cell) degeneration and death seen in 50% of cases of fatty infiltration.

=== Fibro-fatty infiltration ===
The second, fibro-fatty infiltration, involves replacement of myocytes with fibrofatty tissue. A patchy myocarditis is involved in up to 2/3 of cases, with inflammatory infiltrates (mostly T cells) seen on microscopy. Myocardial atrophy is due to injury and apoptosis. This leads to thinning of the RV free wall (to < 3 mm thickness) Myocytes are replaced with fibrofatty tissue. The regions preferentially involved include the RV inflow tract, the RV outflow tract, and the RV apex. However, the LV free wall may be involved in some cases. Involvement of the ventricular septum is rare. The areas involved are prone to aneurysm formation.

=== The Role of Exercise ===
Recently, some studies have identified strenuous exercise as a novel risk for accelerated progression of the disease. One retrospective study on 301 patients conclusively demonstrated that the subpopulations participating in strenuous physical activity (professional athletes for example) had an earlier onset of symptoms and earlier mortality compared to other populations.

== Ventricular arrhythmias ==
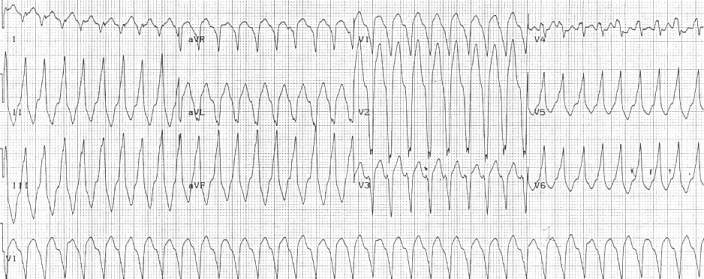
Monomorphic ventricular tachycardia originating from the right ventricular outflow tract

Ventricular arrhythmias due to ACM typically arise from the diseased right ventricle. The type of arrhythmia ranges from frequent premature ventricular complexes (PVCs) to ventricular tachycardia (VT) to ventricular fibrillation (VF).

While the initiating factor of the ventricular arrhythmias is unclear, it may be due to triggered activity or reentry.

Ventricular arrhythmias are usually exercise-related, suggesting that they are sensitive to catecholamines. The ventricular beats typically have a right axis deviation. Multiple morphologies of ventricular tachycardia may be present in the same individual, suggesting multiple arrhythmogenic foci or pathways.

Right ventricular outflow tract (RVOT) tachycardia is the most common VT seen in individuals with ACM. In this case, the EKG shows a left bundle branch block (LBBB) morphology with an inferior axis.

== Diagnosis ==
The differential diagnosis for the ventricular tachycardia due to ACM include:

- Congenital heart disease
  - Repaired tetralogy of Fallot
  - Ebstein's anomaly
  - Uhl's anomaly
  - Atrial septal defect
  - Partial anomalous venous return
- Acquired heart disease
  - Tricuspid valve disease
  - Pulmonary hypertension
  - Right ventricular infarction
  - Bundle-branch re-entrant tachycardia
- Miscellaneous
  - Pre-excited AV re-entry tachycardia
  - Idiopathic RVOT tachycardia
  - Sarcoidosis

In order to make the diagnosis of ACM, a number of clinical tests are employed, including the electrocardiogram (EKG), echocardiography, right ventricular angiography, cardiac MRI, and genetic testing.

=== Electrocardiogram ===
90% of individuals with ARVD have some EKG abnormality. The most common EKG abnormality seen in ACM is T wave inversion in leads V_{1} to V_{3}. However, this is a non-specific finding, and may be considered a normal variant in right bundle branch block (RBBB), women, and children under 12 years old.

RBBB itself is seen frequently in individuals with ACM. This may be due to delayed activation of the right ventricle, rather than any intrinsic abnormality in the right bundle branch.

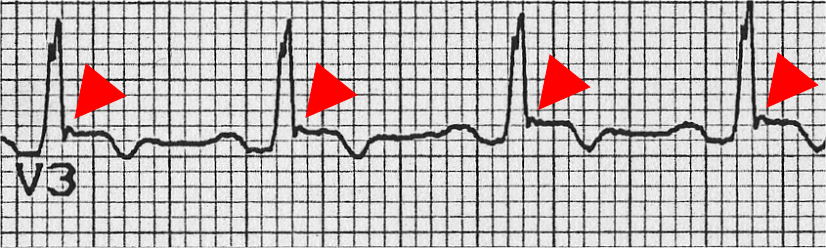
The epsilon wave (marked by red triangle), seen in ARVD.

The epsilon wave is found in about 50% of those with ACM. This is described as a terminal notch in the QRS complex. It is due to slowed intraventricular conduction. The epsilon wave may be seen on a surface EKG; however, it is more commonly seen on signal averaged EKGs.

Ventricular ectopy seen on a surface EKG in the setting of ACM is typically of left bundle branch block (LBBB) morphology, with a QRS axis of −90 to +110 degrees. The origin of the ectopic beats is usually from one of the three regions of fatty degeneration (the "triangle of dysplasia"): the RV outflow tract, the RV inflow tract, and the RV apex.

Signal-averaged ECG (SAECG) is used to detect late potentials and epsilon waves in individuals with ACM.

=== Echocardiography ===
Echocardiography may reveal an enlarged, hypokinetic right ventricle with a paper-thin RV free wall. The dilatation of the RV will cause dilatation of the tricuspid valve annulus, with subsequent tricuspid regurgitation. Paradoxical septal motion may also be present.

=== Magnetic resonance imaging ===
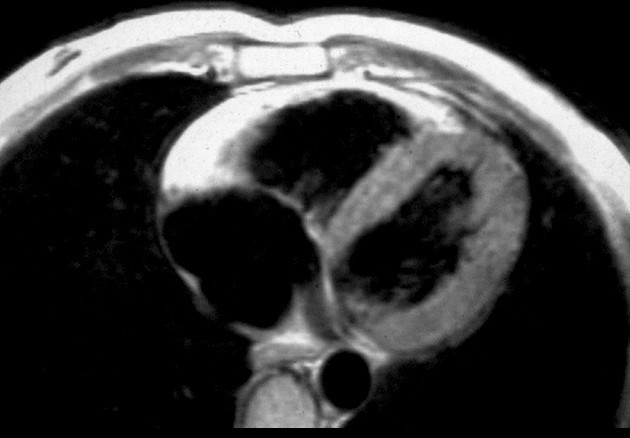
MRI in a patient affected by ARVC/D (long axis view of the right ventricle): note the transmural diffuse bright signal in the RV free wall on spin echo T1 (a) due to massive myocardial atrophy with fatty replacement (b).

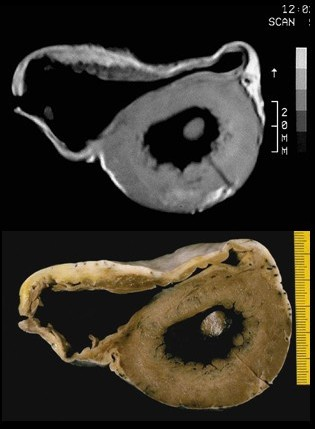
In vitro MRI and corresponding cross section of the heart in ARVD show RV dilatation with anterior and posterior aneurysms (17-year-old asymptomatic male athlete who died suddenly during a soccer game).

Fatty infiltration of the RV free wall can be visible on cardiac MRI. Fat has increased intensity in T1-weighted images. However, it may be difficult to differentiate intramyocardial fat and the epicardial fat that is commonly seen adjacent to the normal heart. Also, the sub-tricuspid region may be difficult to distinguish from the atrioventricular sulcus, which is rich in fat.

Cardiac MRI can visualize the extreme thinning and akinesis of the RV free wall. However, the normal RV free wall may be about 3 mm thick, making the test less sensitive.

=== Angiography ===
Right ventricular angiography is considered the gold standard for the diagnosis of ACM. Findings consistent with ACM are an akinetic or dyskinetic bulging localized to the infundibular, apical, and subtricuspid regions of the RV. The specificity is 90%; however, the test is observer dependent.

=== Biopsy ===
Transvenous biopsy of the right ventricle can be highly specific for ACM, but it has low sensitivity. False positives include other conditions with fatty infiltration of the ventricle, such as long-term excessive alcohol use and Duchenne or Becker muscular dystrophy.

False negatives are common, however, because the disease progresses typically from the epicardium to the endocardium (with the biopsy sample coming from the endocardium), and the segmental nature of the disease. Also, due to the paper-thin right ventricular free wall that is common in this disease process, most biopsy samples are taken from the ventricular septum, which is commonly not involved in the disease process.

A biopsy sample that is consistent with ACM would have > 3% fat, >40% fibrous tissue, and <45% myocytes.

A post mortem histological demonstration of full thickness substitution of the RV myocardium by fatty or fibro-fatty tissue is consistent with ACM.

=== Genetic testing ===
ACM is an autosomal dominant trait with reduced penetrance. Approximately 40–50% of ACM patients have a mutation identified in one of several genes encoding components of the desmosome, which can help confirm a diagnosis of ACM. Since ACM is an autosomal dominant trait, children of an ACM patient have a 50% chance of inheriting the disease-causing mutation. Whenever a mutation is identified by genetic testing, family-specific genetic testing can be used to differentiate between relatives who are at-risk for the disease and those who are not. ACM genetic testing is clinically available.

=== Diagnostic criteria ===
There is no pathognomonic feature of ACM. The diagnosis of ACM is based on a combination of major and minor criteria. To make a diagnosis of ACM requires either 2 major criteria or 1 major and 2 minor criteria or 4 minor criteria.

Major criteria

- Right ventricular dysfunction
  - Severe dilatation and reduction of RV ejection fraction with little or no LV impairment
  - Localized RV aneurysms
  - Severe segmental dilatation of the RV
- Tissue characterization
  - Fibrofatty replacement of myocardium on endomyocardial biopsy
- Electrocardiographical abnormalities
  - Epsilon waves in V_{1} – V_{3}
  - Localized prolongation (>110 ms) of QRS in V_{1} – V_{3}
  - Inverted T waves in V1 -V_{3} in an individual over 12 years old, in the absence of a right bundle branch block (RBBB)
  - Ventricular tachycardia with a left bundle branch block (LBBB) morphology, with superior axis
- Family history
  - Familial disease confirmed either clinically or on autopsy or surgery

Minor criteria

- Right ventricular dysfunction
  - Mild global RV dilatation and/or reduced ejection fraction with normal LV.
  - Mild segmental dilatation of the RV
  - Regional RV hypokinesis
- Tissue characterization
- Electrocardiographical abnormalities
  - Late potentials on signal averaged EKG.
  - Ventricular tachycardia with a left bundle branch block (LBBB) morphology, with inferior or unknown axis
  - Frequent PVCs (> 500 PVCs / 24 hours)

== Management ==
The goal of management of ACM is to decrease the incidence of sudden cardiac death. This raises a clinical dilemma: How to prophylactically treat the asymptomatic patient who was diagnosed during family screening.

A certain subgroup of individuals with ACM are considered at high risk for sudden cardiac death. Associated characteristics include:

- Young age
- Competitive sports activity
- Malignant familial history
- Extensive RV disease with decreased right ventricular ejection fraction.
- Left ventricular involvement
- Syncope
- Episode of ventricular arrhythmia

Management options include pharmacological, surgical, catheter ablation, and placement of an implantable cardioverter-defibrillator.

Prior to the decision of the treatment option, programmed electrical stimulation in the electrophysiology laboratory may be performed for additional prognostic information. Goals of programmed stimulation include:

- Assessment of the disease's arrhythmogenic potential
- Evaluate the hemodynamic consequences of sustained VT
- Determine whether the VT can be interrupted via antitachycardia pacing (ATP).

Regardless of the management option chosen, the individual is typically advised to undergo lifestyle modification, including avoidance of strenuous exercise, cardiac stimulants (i.e.: caffeine, nicotine, pseudoephedrine) and alcohol.

Regarding physical activity and exercise, ARVC patients, as well as gene carriers of pathogenic ARVC-associated desmosomal mutations, should not participate in competitive sports. These patients should be advised to limit their exercise programmes to leisure-time activities and remain under clinical surveillance.

=== Medication ===
Pharmacologic management of ACM involves arrhythmia suppression and prevention of thrombus formation.

Sotalol, a beta blocker and a class III antiarrhythmic agent, is the most effective antiarrhythmic agent in ACM. Other antiarrhythmic agents used include amiodarone and conventional beta blockers (i.e.: metoprolol). If antiarrhythmic agents are used, their efficacy should be guided by series ambulatory Holter monitoring, to show a reduction in arrhythmic events.

While angiotensin converting enzyme inhibitors (ACE Inhibitors) are well known for slowing progression in other cardiomyopathies, they have not been proven to be helpful in ACM.

Individuals with decreased RV ejection fraction with dyskinetic portions of the right ventricle may benefit from long term anticoagulation with warfarin to prevent thrombus formation and subsequent pulmonary embolism.

=== Catheter ablation ===
Catheter ablation may be used to treat intractable ventricular tachycardia. It has a 60–90% success rate. Unfortunately, due to the progressive nature of the disease, recurrence is common (60% recurrence rate), with the creation of new arrhythmogenic foci. Indications for catheter ablation include drug-refractory VT and frequent recurrence of VT after ICD placement, causing frequent discharges of the ICD.

=== Implantable cardioverter-defibrillator ===
An ICD is the most effective prevention against sudden cardiac death. Due to the prohibitive cost of ICDs, they are not routinely placed in all individuals with ACM.

Indications for ICD placement in the setting of ACM include:

- Cardiac arrest due to VT or VF
- Symptomatic VT that is not inducible during programmed stimulation
- Failed programmed stimulation-guided drug therapy
- Severe RV involvement with poor tolerance of VT
- Sudden death of immediate family member

Since ICDs are typically placed via a transvenous approach into the right ventricle, there are complications associated with ICD placement and follow-up.

Due to the extreme thinning of the RV free wall, it is possible to perforate the RV during implantation, potentially causing pericardial tamponade. Because of this, every attempt is made at placing the defibrillator lead on the ventricular septum.

After a successful implantation, the progressive nature of the disease may lead to fibro-fatty replacement of the myocardium at the site of lead placement. This may lead to undersensing of the individual's electrical activity (potentially causing inability to sense VT or VF), and inability to pace the ventricle.

=== Heart transplant ===
Heart transplant may be performed in ACM. It may be indicated if the arrhythmias associated with the disease are uncontrollable or if there is severe bi-ventricular heart failure that is not manageable with pharmacological therapy.

=== Family screening ===
All first degree family members of the affected individual should be screened for ACM. This is used to establish the pattern of inheritance. Screening should begin during the teenage years unless otherwise indicated. Screening tests include:

- Echocardiogram
- EKG
- Signal averaged EKG
- Holter monitoring
- Cardiac MRI
- Exercise stress test

== Prognosis ==
There is a long asymptomatic lead-time in individuals with ACM. While this is a genetically transmitted disease, individuals in their teens may not have any characteristics of ACM on screening tests.

Many individuals have symptoms associated with ventricular tachycardia, such as palpitations, light-headedness, or syncope. Others may have symptoms and signs related to right ventricular failure, such as lower extremity edema, or liver congestion with elevated hepatic enzymes.

ACM is a progressive disease. Over time, the right ventricle becomes more involved, leading to right ventricular failure. The right ventricle will fail before there is left ventricular dysfunction. However, by the time the individual has signs of overt right ventricular failure, there will be histological involvement of the left ventricle. Eventually, the left ventricle will also become involved, leading to bi-ventricular failure. Signs and symptoms of left ventricular failure may become evident, including congestive heart failure, atrial fibrillation, and an increased incidence of thromboembolic events.

== Epidemiology ==
The prevalence of ACM is about 1/10,000 in the general population in the United States, although some studies have suggested that it may be as common as 1/1,000. Recently, 1/200 were found to be carriers of mutations that predispose to ACM. Based on these findings and other evidence, it is thought that in most patients, additional factors such as other genes, athletic lifestyle, exposure to certain viruses, etc. may be required for a patient to eventually develop signs and symptoms of ACM. It accounts for up to 17% of all sudden cardiac deaths in the young. In Italy, the prevalence is 40/10,000, making it the most common cause of sudden cardiac death in the young population. In Newfoundland, as many as one in 1,000 of the population are affected.

== Society and culture ==
=== Notable cases ===
- Columbus Crew midfielder Kirk Urso collapsed out with friends on August 5, 2012, and was pronounced dead an hour later. An autopsy later revealed the disease to be the likely culprit.
- Sevilla FC and Spanish international left wing-back Antonio Puerta died from the condition, at the age of 22, on 28 August 2007, three days after suffering several cardiac arrests, while disputing a La Liga game against Getafe CF.
- Englishman Matt Gadsby also died from the condition after collapsing on the pitch on 9 September 2006, while playing for Hinckley United in a Conference North game against Harrogate Town.
- Suzanne Crough, an American child actress best known for her role on The Partridge Family, died suddenly from the condition in 2015 at age 52.
- James Taylor English international cricketer, retired April 2016.
- Krissy Taylor, an American model, died at the age of 17 on July 2, 1995, in the family home in Florida. Her official cause of death was cardiac arrhythmia and severe asthma, the latter of which she had never been diagnosed with. Her family had independent experts examine tissue samples of her heart muscle and they concluded that the most likely cause of death was a missed diagnosis of ACM.
- Jordan Boyd (1997–2013), Canadian junior hockey player. He was posthumously diagnosed with the ailment after passing away from a collapse from training camp in 2013.
- On 4 March 2018, Fiorentina captain Davide Astori was found dead in his hotel room. After the autopsy, an arrhythmogenic cardiomyopathy with biventricular involvement was diagnosed.
- During a Serie B match on 14 April 2012, Piermario Morosini collapsed on the field. Despite immediate medical treatment, Morosini died at the age of 25. The autopsy confirmed that the cause of death was arrhythmia caused by arrhythmogenic cardiomyopathy.

== See also ==
- List of conditions caused by problems with junctional proteins
