= Adherens junction =

Protein complexes at cell junctions

Details

Identifiers
- Latin: junctio adhaesionis
- MeSH: D022005
- TH: H1.00.01.1.02002
- FMA: 67400

Principal interactions of structural proteins at cadherin-based adherens junction. Actin filaments are associated with adherens junctions in addition to several other actin-binding proteins such as vinculin. The head domain of vinculin associates to E-cadherin via α-, β - and γ -catenins. The tail domain of vinculin binds to membrane lipids and to actin filaments.

In cell biology, adherens junctions (or zonula adherens, intermediate junction, or "belt desmosome") are protein complexes that occur at cell–cell junctions and cell–matrix junctions in epithelial and endothelial tissues, usually more basal than tight junctions. An adherens junction is defined as a cell junction whose cytoplasmic face is linked to the actin cytoskeleton. They can appear as bands encircling the cell (zonula adherens) or as spots of attachment to the extracellular matrix (focal adhesion).

Adherens junctions uniquely disassemble in uterine epithelial cells to allow the blastocyst to penetrate between epithelial cells.

A similar cell junction in non-epithelial, non-endothelial cells is the fascia adherens. It is structurally the same, but appears in ribbonlike patterns that do not completely encircle the cells. One example is in cardiomyocytes.

== Proteins ==
Adherens junctions are composed of the following proteins:

- cadherins. The cadherins are a family of transmembrane proteins that form homodimers in a calcium-dependent manner with other cadherin molecules on adjacent cells.
- p120 (sometimes called delta catenin) binds the juxtamembrane region of the cadherin.
- γ-catenin or gamma-catenin (plakoglobin) binds the catenin-binding region of the cadherin.
- α-catenin or alpha-catenin binds the cadherin indirectly via β-catenin or plakoglobin and links the actin cytoskeleton with cadherin. Significant protein dynamics are thought to be involved.

== Models ==
Adherens junctions were, for many years, thought to share the characteristic of anchor cells through their cytoplasmic actin filaments.

Adherens junctions may serve as a regulatory module to maintain the actin contractile ring with which it is associated in microscopic studies.

== See also ==
- Tight junction
