= Skin fragility syndrome =

- Other names: Plakophilin 1 deficiency
- This condition is inherited in an autosomal recessive manner.
- Specialty: Dermatology

Skin fragility syndrome (also known as "plakophilin 1 deficiency") is a cutaneous condition characterized by trauma-induced blisters and erosions.

It is associated with PKP1.

== See also ==
- List of conditions caused by problems with junctional proteins
