= DSC1 =

Protein-coding gene in the species Homo sapiens

Identifiers
- Aliases: DSC1, CDHF1, DG2/DG3, desmocollin 1
- External IDs: OMIM: 125643; MGI: 109173; GeneCards: DSC1
Available structures
PDB	Ortholog search: PDBe RCSB
PDB	List of PDB id codes 5IRY

Gene location (Human)
Chr.	Chromosome 18 (human)
Band	18q12.1	Start	31,129,236 bp
Band	18q12.1	End	31,162,856 bp

Gene location (Mouse)
Chr.	Chromosome 18 (mouse)
Band	18|18 A2	Start	20,217,241 bp
Band	18|18 A2	End	20,247,928 bp
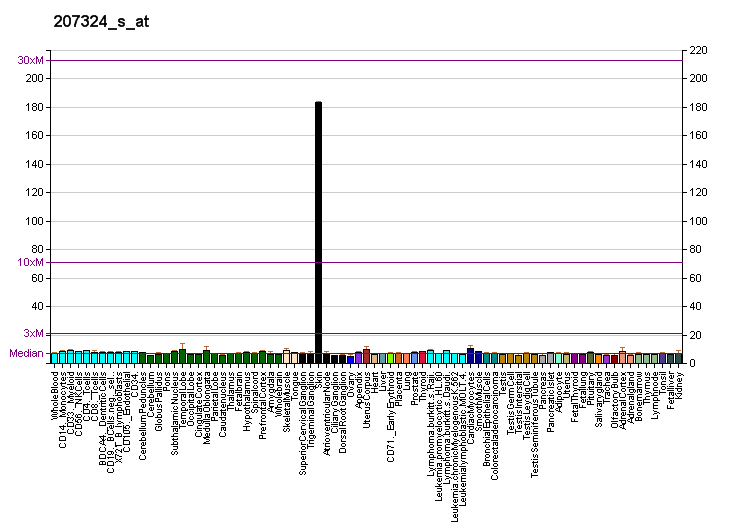
RNA expression pattern
Bgee	Human / Mouse (ortholog); Top expressed in: skin of thigh; skin of hip; skin of arm; human penis; nipple; vulva; skin of abdomen; cardiac muscle tissue of right atrium; hair follicle; right auricle of heart / Top expressed in: skin of external ear; hair follicle; esophagus; skin of back; lip; condyle; umbilical cord; skin of abdomen; fossa; human fetus; More reference expression data
BioGPS	More reference expression data
Gene ontology
Molecular function	calcium ion binding; metal ion binding
Cellular component	integral component of membrane; gap junction; cell junction; desmosome; extracellular exosome; membrane; cornified envelope; plasma membrane; ficolin-1-rich granule membrane; cell-cell junction
Biological process	cell adhesion; homophilic cell adhesion via plasma membrane adhesion molecules; keratinization; neutrophil degranulation; cornification; cell-cell adhesion
Sources:Amigo / QuickGO
Orthologs
Databases	NCBI: entry; OMA: entry
Species	Human	Mouse
Entrez	1823	13505
Ensembl	ENSG00000134765	ENSMUSG00000044322
UniProt	Q08554	P55849
RefSeq (mRNA)	NM_024421; NM_004948	NM_001291804; NM_013504
RefSeq (protein)	NP_004939; NP_077739	NP_001278733; NP_038532
Location (UCSC)	Chr 18: 31.13 – 31.16 Mb	Chr 18: 20.22 – 20.25 Mb
PubMed search
- Wikidata
View/Edit Human	View/Edit Mouse

Desmocollin-1 is a protein that in humans is encoded by the DSC1 gene.

The protein encoded by this gene is a calcium-dependent glycoprotein that is a member of the desmocollin subfamily of the cadherin superfamily. These desmosomal family members, along with the desmogleins, are found primarily in epithelial cells where they constitute the adhesive proteins of the desmosome cell-cell junction and are required for cell adhesion and desmosome formation. The desmosomal family members are arranged in two clusters on chromosome 18, occupying less than 650 kb combined. Alternative splicing results in two transcript variants encoding distinct isoforms.

== Interactions ==
DSC1 has been shown to interact with Desmoglein 2.
