= Plakophilin-1 =

Protein found in humans

PKP1
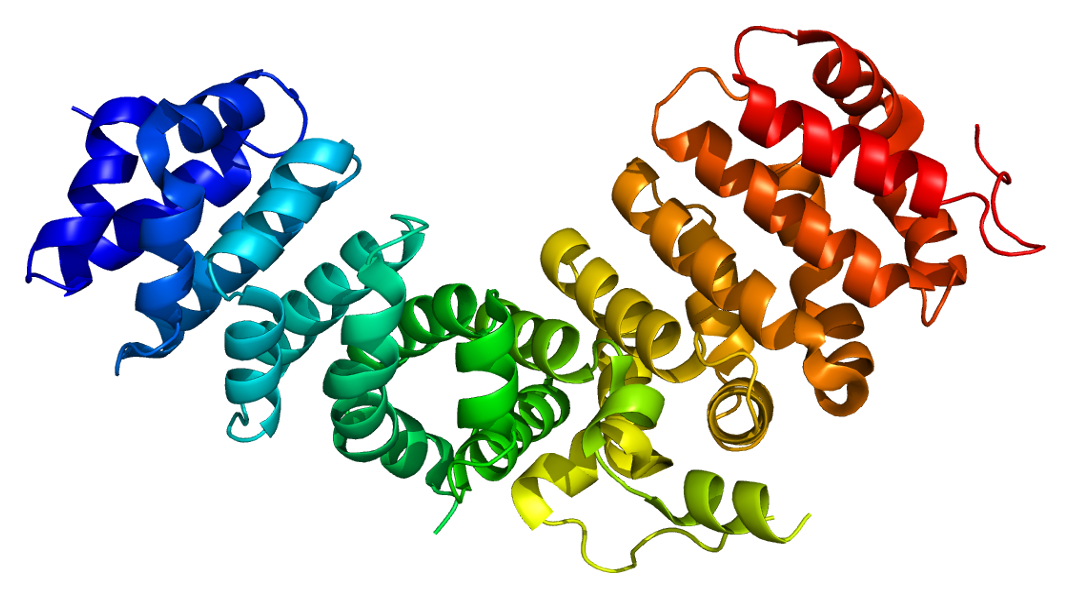

Identifiers
- Aliases: PKP1, B6P, plakophilin 1, EDSFS
- External IDs: OMIM: 601975; MGI: 1328359; GeneCards: PKP1
Available structures
PDB	Ortholog search: PDBe RCSB
PDB	List of PDB id codes 1XM9

Gene location (Human)
Chr.	Chromosome 1 (human)
Band	1q32.1	Start	201,283,452 bp
Band	1q32.1	End	201,332,993 bp

Gene location (Mouse)
Chr.	Chromosome 1 (mouse)
Band	1|1 E4	Start	135,799,133 bp
Band	1|1 E4	End	135,846,945 bp
RNA expression pattern
Bgee	Human / Mouse (ortholog); Top expressed in: skin of arm; skin of abdomen; skin of leg; skin of thigh; gums; gingival epithelium; vulva; skin of hip; human penis; nipple / Top expressed in: skin of external ear; hair follicle; lip; skin of back; esophagus; conjunctival fornix; skin of abdomen; molar; corneal stroma; condyle; More reference expression data
BioGPS	n/a
Gene ontology
Molecular function	structural constituent of skin epidermis; protein binding; intermediate filament binding; signal transducer activity; lamin binding; cadherin binding
Cellular component	intracellular membrane-bounded organelle; cell junction; intermediate filament; nucleoplasm; plasma membrane; nucleus; desmosome; cornified envelope; ficolin-1-rich granule membrane; messenger ribonucleoprotein complex; cytoplasm; cell-cell junction
Biological process	multicellular organism development; intermediate filament bundle assembly; signal transduction; cell adhesion; keratinization; neutrophil degranulation; cornification; positive regulation of gene expression; negative regulation of mRNA catabolic process; cell-cell adhesion; cell-cell junction assembly
Sources:Amigo / QuickGO
Orthologs
Databases	NCBI: entry; OMA: entry
Species	Human	Mouse
Entrez	5317	18772
Ensembl	ENSG00000081277	ENSMUSG00000026413
UniProt	Q13835	P97350
RefSeq (mRNA)	NM_001005337; NM_000299	NM_019645; NM_001313701
RefSeq (protein)	NP_000290; NP_001005337	NP_001300630; NP_062619
Location (UCSC)	Chr 1: 201.28 – 201.33 Mb	Chr 1: 135.8 – 135.85 Mb
PubMed search
- Wikidata
View/Edit Human	View/Edit Mouse

Plakophilin-1 is a protein that in humans is encoded by the PKP1 gene.

== Function ==
This gene encodes a member of the arm-repeat (armadillo) and plakophilin gene families. Plakophilin proteins contain numerous armadillo repeats, localize to cell desmosomes and nuclei, and participate in linking cadherins to intermediate filaments in the cytoskeleton. This protein may be involved in molecular recruitment and stabilization during desmosome formation. Mutations in this gene have been associated with the ectodermal dysplasia/skin fragility syndrome.

== Interactions ==
PKP1 has been shown to interact with Desmoplakin.

== See also ==
- Skin fragility syndrome
