= Intercalated disc =

Microscopic feature of cardiac muscle

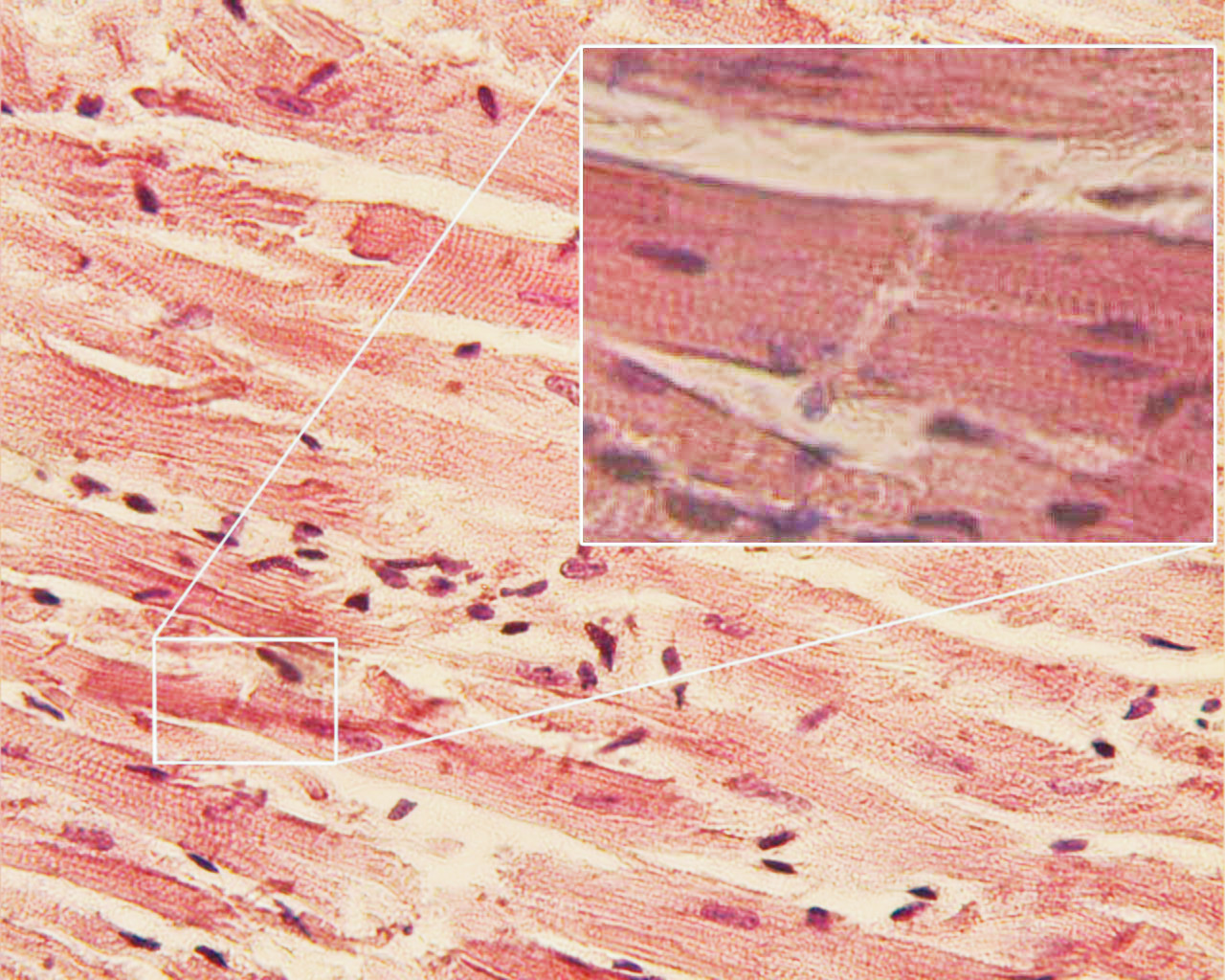
- Cardiac muscle, an intercalated disc can be seen joining cardiomyocytes in magnified section

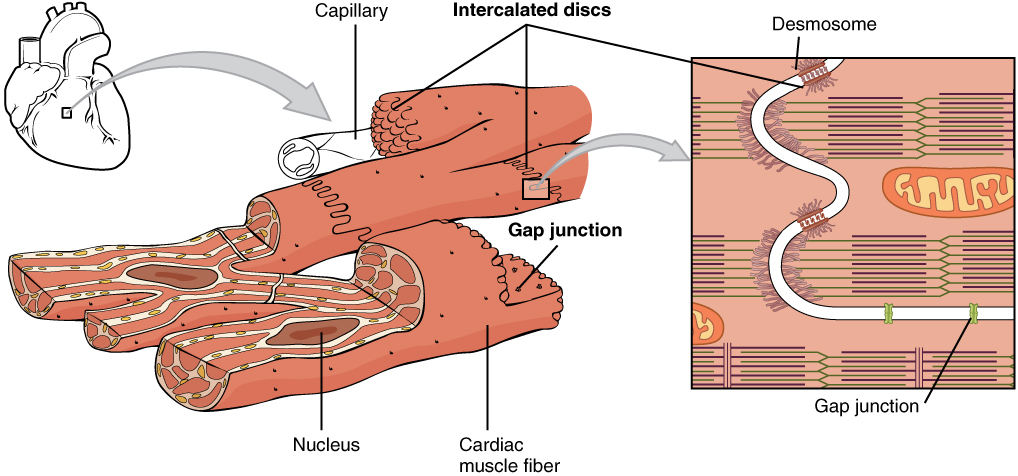
- Intercalated discs, desmosomes and gap junctions in cardiac muscle fiber.

Details
- Part of: Cardiac muscle

Identifiers
- Latin: discus intercalaris, discus intercalatus
- TH: H2.00.05.2.02006

Intercalated discs or lines of Eberth are microscopic identifying features of cardiac muscle. Cardiac muscle consists of individual heart muscle cells (cardiomyocytes) connected by intercalated discs to work as a single functional syncytium. By contrast, skeletal muscle consists of multinucleated muscle fibers and exhibits no intercalated discs. Intercalated discs support synchronized contraction of cardiac tissue in a wave-like pattern so that the heart can work like a pump. They occur at the Z line of the sarcomere and can be visualized easily when observing a longitudinal section of the tissue.

== Structure ==
Intercalated discs are complex structures that connect adjacent cardiac muscle cells. The three types of cell junction recognised as making up an intercalated disc are desmosomes, fascia adherens junctions, and gap junctions.

- Fascia adherens are anchoring sites for actin, and connect to the closest sarcomere.
- Desmosomes prevent separation during contraction by binding intermediate filaments, anchoring the cell membrane to the intermediate filament network, joining the cells together.
- Gap junctions connect the cytoplasms of neighboring cells electrically allowing cardiac action potentials to spread between cardiac cells by permitting the passage of ions between cells, producing depolarization of the heart muscle.

All of these junctions work together as a single unit called the area composita.

== Clinical significance ==
Mutations in the intercalated disc gene are responsible for various cardiomyopathies that can lead to heart failure.

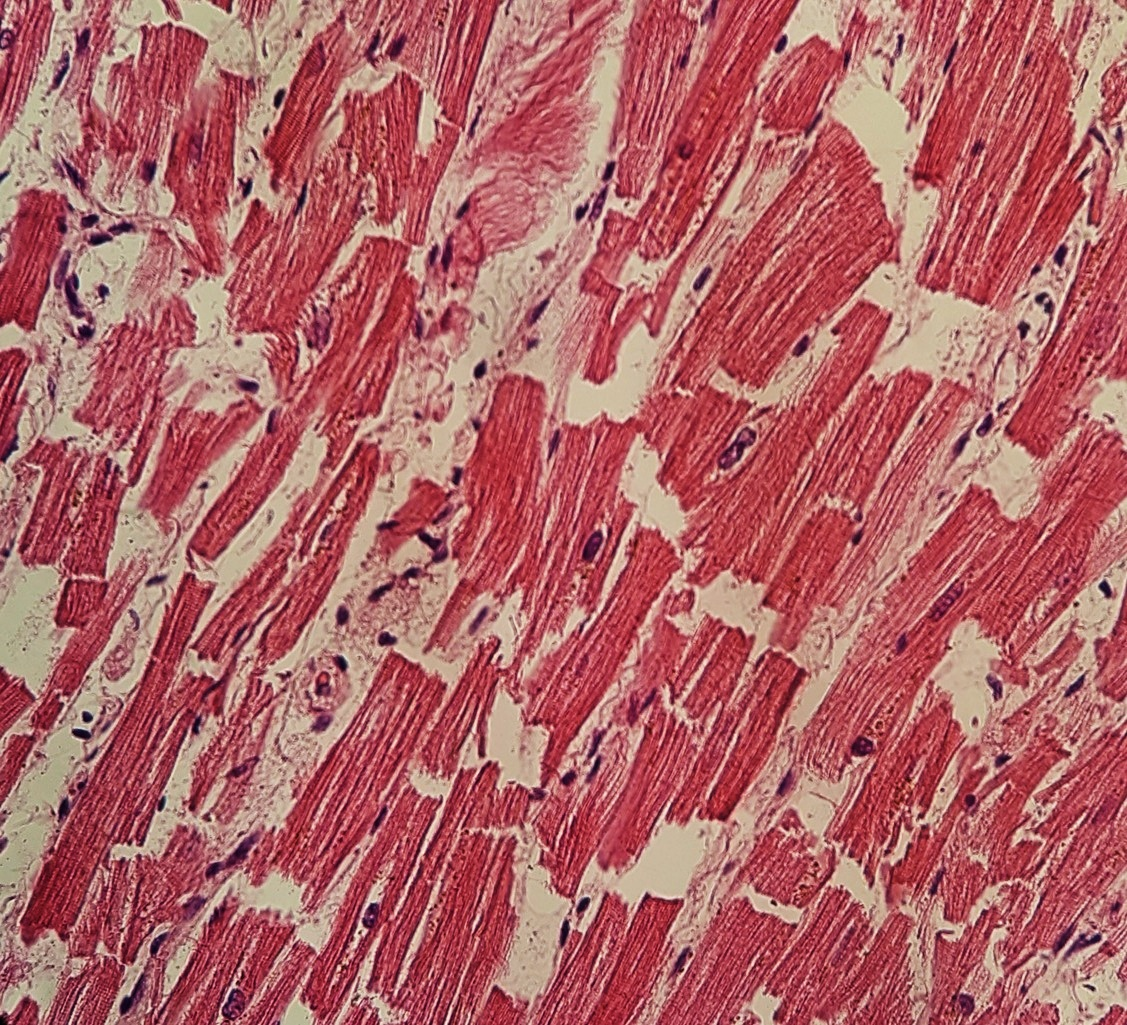
Ruptured intercalated discs, in this case regarded as a visual artifact.

Ruptured intercalated discs, when seen on histopathology, have two main causes:

- Microtome sectioning, thereby being a visual artifact.
- Forceful myocardial contraction, in turn mainly caused by ventricular fibrillation or electrical injury.

Additional signs indicating forceful myocardial contraction are:

- Alternating bundles of hypercontracted myocytes with hyperdistended ones.
- Square-shaped myocardiocyte nuclei.
- Hyperdistended myocardiocytes with detached sarcomeres, and in proximity of hypercontracted myocardiocytes.
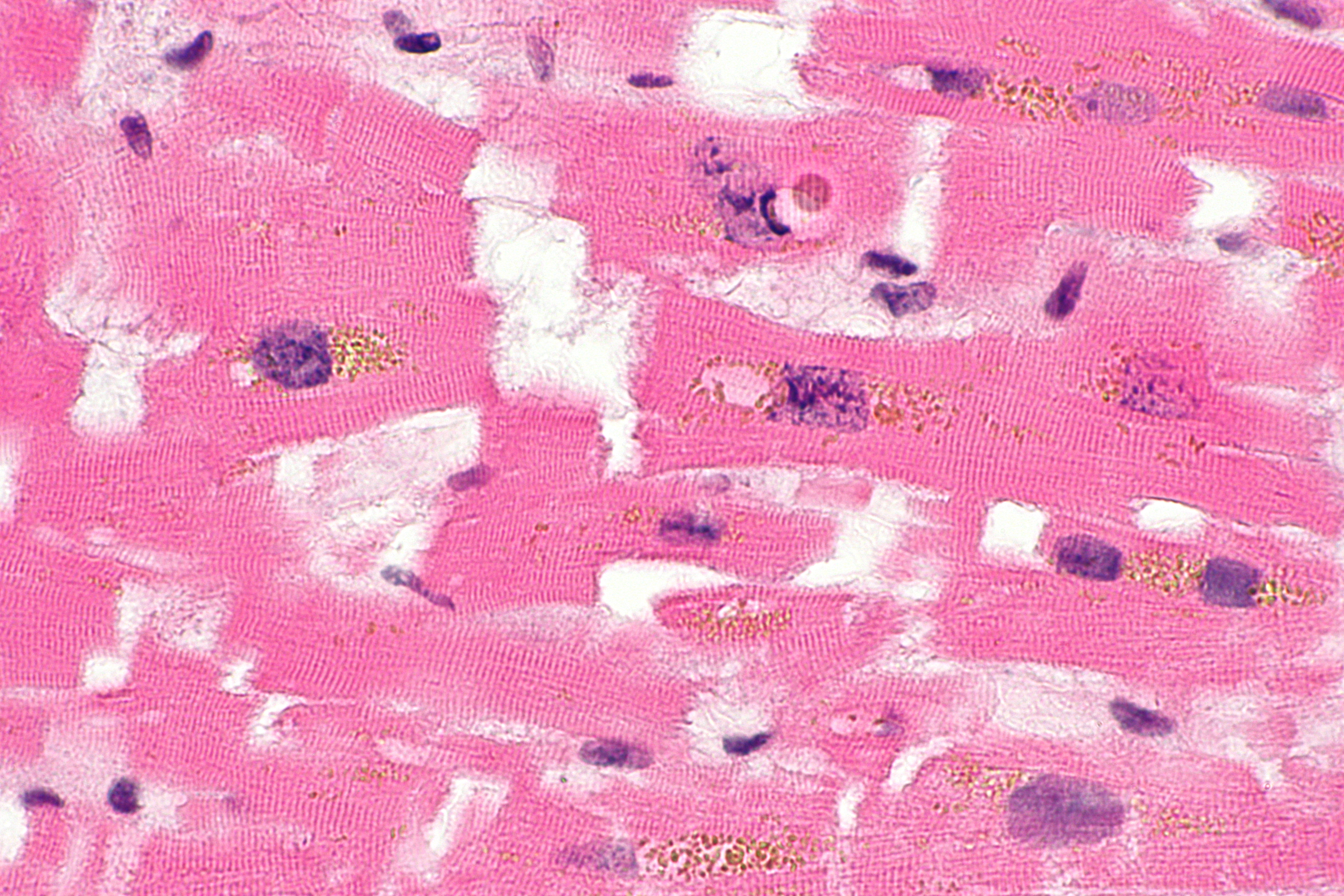
Square-shaped nuclei, indicating forceful myocardial contraction.
