= List of target antigens in pemphigus =

Circulating auto-antibodies in the human body can target normal parts of the skin leading to disease. This is a list of antigens in the skin that may become targets of circulating auto-antibodies leading to the various types of pemphigus.

Target antigens for the different pemphigus variants
Pemphigus variant	Antibody isotype	Antigen	Molecular weight (KDa)
Mucosal pemphigus vulgaris	IgG	Desmoglein 3	130
Mucocutaneous pemphigus vulgaris	IgG	Desmoglein 3 Desmoglein 1	130; 160
Pemphigus foliaceus	IgG	Desmoglein 1	160
Paraneoplastic pemphigus	IgG	Desmoglein 3 Desmoglein 1 BPAG1 (Note: Notably not BPAG2); Plectin; Desmoplakin I (Note: Desmoplakin I and II autoantibodies have also been reported in Stevens–Johnson syndrome); Desmoplakin II; Envoplakin; Periplakin; Alpha-2-macroglobulin-like-1	130; 160; 230; 500; 250; 210; 210; 190; 170
Drug-induced pemphigus	IgG	Desmoglein 3 Desmoglein 1	130; 160
Subcorneal pustular dermatosis type of IgA pemphigus	IgA1	Desmocollin 1	110/100
Intraepidermal neutrophilic type of IgA pemphigus	IgA1	Unknown	
Pemphigus erythematosus (Senear–Usher syndrome) (Note: Parentheticals are used to indicate other names by which a condition is known. If there are multiple alternative names for a condition, they are separated by commas within the parenthetical.)	IgG	Desmoglein 1	160
Fogo selvagem	IgG	Desmoglein 1	160
Pemphigus vegetans	IgG	Desmoglein 3	130
Pemphigus vegetans of Hallopeau (Note: Pemphigus vegetans of Hallopeau represents a mild form of pemphigus vegetans. Pemphigus vegetans of Neumann represents a severe form of pemphigus vegetans.)	IgG	Desmoglein 3	130
Pemphigus vegetans of Neumann	IgG	Desmoglein 3	130
Pemphigus herpetiformis	IgG	Desmoglein 3 Desmoglein 1	130; 160

== See also ==
- List of target antigens in pemphigoid
- List of conditions caused by problems with junctional proteins
- List of immunofluorescence findings for autoimmune bullous conditions
- List of cutaneous conditions
- List of genes mutated in cutaneous conditions
- List of histologic stains that aid in diagnosis of cutaneous conditions
