= Pemphigus erythematosus =

- Other names: Senear–Usher syndrome
- Pronunciation: /ˈpɛmfɪɡəs ˌɛrɪθɪməˈtoʊsəs/
- Specialty: Dermatology
- Symptoms: Flaccid bullae (blisters), crusted plaques, photosensitivity
- Usual onset: 40 - 60 years of age
- Duration: Long term
- Causes: Unclear
- Diagnostic method: Based on symptoms, blood tests, and skin biopsy
- Differential diagnosis: Pemphigus foliaceus, systemic lupus erythematosus
- Treatment: Corticosteroids, mycophenolate mofetil, and anti-CD20 antibodies

Pemphigus erythematosus (Senear-Usher Syndrome) is a rare form of pemphigus with features of pemphigus foliaceus and lupus erythematosus. It was first described by Francis Senear and Barney Usher at the University of Illinois College of Medicine in 1926. Patients with pemphigus erythematosus typically present with flaccid scaling blisters on the face, scalp, and trunk in sun-exposed areas. Patients may also have a butterfly-shaped malar rash similar to systemic lupus erythematosus.

Pemphigus is an autoimmune disease that involves antibodies targeting a protein called desmoglein in the top layer of the skin that holds skin cells together. The proteins are destroyed or disabled by the immune system, leading to the separation of the skin layers, which causes the blisters. The separation itself is called acantholysis.

Patients with pemphigus erythematosus have antibodies against desmoglein-1 primarily, similar to pemphigus foliaceus. Pemphigus erythematosus and pemphigus foliaceus both exhibit superficial blistering of the skin with minimal involvement on the mucosa (eg. mouth). This is in contrast to pemphigus vulgaris, which has antibodies against desmoglein-3 primarily. Patients with pemphigus erythematosus will have positive ANA serology, a common feature of lupus.

== Signs and symptoms ==
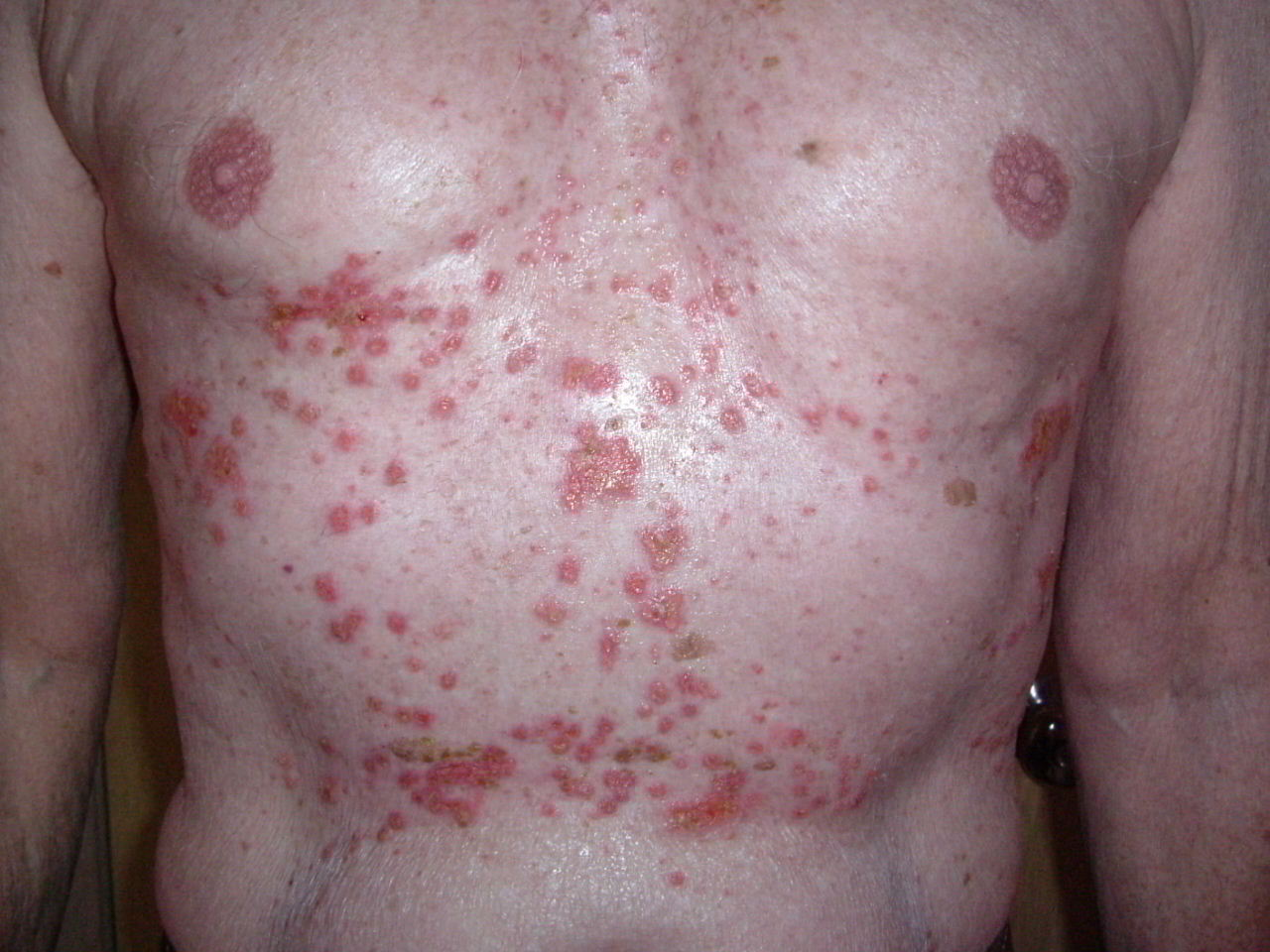
Superficial erosions of pemphigus erythematosus may look similar to Grover's disease (pictured)

Patients with pemphigus erythematosus typically present with superficially eroded lesions, or vesiculobullae, that may ooze and crust. This is especially common in areas of the body that are exposed to the sun, like the back, upper chest, and face. The lesions are initially flaccid bullae that progress to crusted or scaly erosions with a red/pink base. The early appearance of the lesions may be confused with other acantholytic processes like Grover's Disease, or cutaneous lupus.

The symptoms of pemphigus erythematosus usually appear slowly and progress slowly. The patient might not be aware that their condition is photosensitive, although the lesions frequently appear on sun-exposed areas and flare after prolonged exposure to the sun.

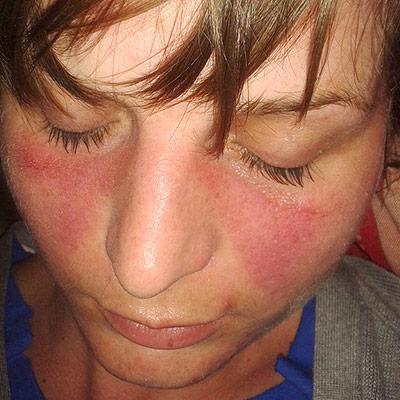
Patient with lupus showing malar erythema without blisters

The facial rash in pemphigus erythematosus is unique to the disease, as it is not seen in pemphigus foliaceus. The appearance of crusted blisters on the cheeks and under the eyes that avoid the mouth and nasolabial folds is highly specific for pemphigus erythematosus. Although lupus patients may present with a rash in the same distribution, it does not present with blisters.

Other forms of pemphigus present with oral blisters, which are often the first symptoms of the disease. Pemphigus erythematosus, however, does not produce oral ulcers, or any other mucosal lesions. Pemphigus erythematosus targets desmoglein 1, which is primarily found in the skin. Desmoglein 3 is present in higher numbers in the mucosa. Pemphigus vulgaris targets desmoglein 3 and therefore produces mouth ulcers.

== Pathophysiology ==
Desmosomes between skin cells are the target of pemphigus antibodies.

Pemphigus patients experience an autoimmune reaction that targets desmosomes, which are the structures that hold skin cells together. Desmosomes are made of many different proteins, including proteins in the cadherin family like desmocollins and desmogleins. Patients with pemphigus have antibodies targeting their desmoglein proteins, triggering the immune system to destroy them. Fewer numbers of functional desmoglein proteins lead to the separation of skin cells from one another. When a large number of skin cells separate in one area, this forms a blister. The blisters often appear wet or crusted, which is caused by serous fluid leaking through the compromised skin barrier.

The photosensitivity of pemphigus erythematosus is thought to occur by a similar mechanism to that of lupus. Exposure to the sun's UV rays damages skin cells, leading to apoptosis (controlled cell death) and necrosis (uncontrolled cell death). In turn, cellular proteins including desmogleins are released from the cell, becoming exposed to pemphigus antibodies, causing an inflammatory reaction.

The cause of autoimmune pemphigus is generally unknown; however, certain medications have been linked to the development of pemphigus erythematosus. For example, pemphigus erythematosus flares have been linked to atorvastatin use. There has been one report of a new case of pemphigus erythematosus following topical ingenol mebutate treatment.

== Diagnosis ==
Like other forms of pemphigus, pemphigus erythematosus is diagnosed by physical symptoms, skin biopsies, and blood tests.

- Punch biopsies are the primary type of skin biopsy performed to diagnose pemphigus erythematosus. Hematoxylin and Eosin staining is used to view the appearance of the lesion under the microscope; these biopsy samples are taken from inside the blister.
- Direct immunofluorescence studies are used to view the presence of pemphigus antibodies deposited between the skin cells; these biopsies are performed on perilesional skin (the skin next to the blister). This is the most specific diagnostic test for pemphigus erythematosus.
- Indirect immunofluorescence studies can also be used to view the presence of pemphigus antibodies, however, this test involves taking a sample of the patient's blood and testing it on animal tissue (eg. monkey esophagus) and does not require a biopsy.
- Anti-desmoglein antibody serology may be used to find antibodies in the blood that are unique to pemphigus erythematosus. Patients with the disease will have a positive ELISA result for anti-desmoglein-1 antibody and a negative result for anti-desmoglein-3 antibodies.
- Antinuclear antibody (ANA) serology can be used as a screening test for pemphigus erythematosus. This test is not specific to the disease, but high titers of ANA and SSA in a patient with facial blisters on sun-exposed skin is highly suggestive of pemphigus erythematosus.

== Treatment ==
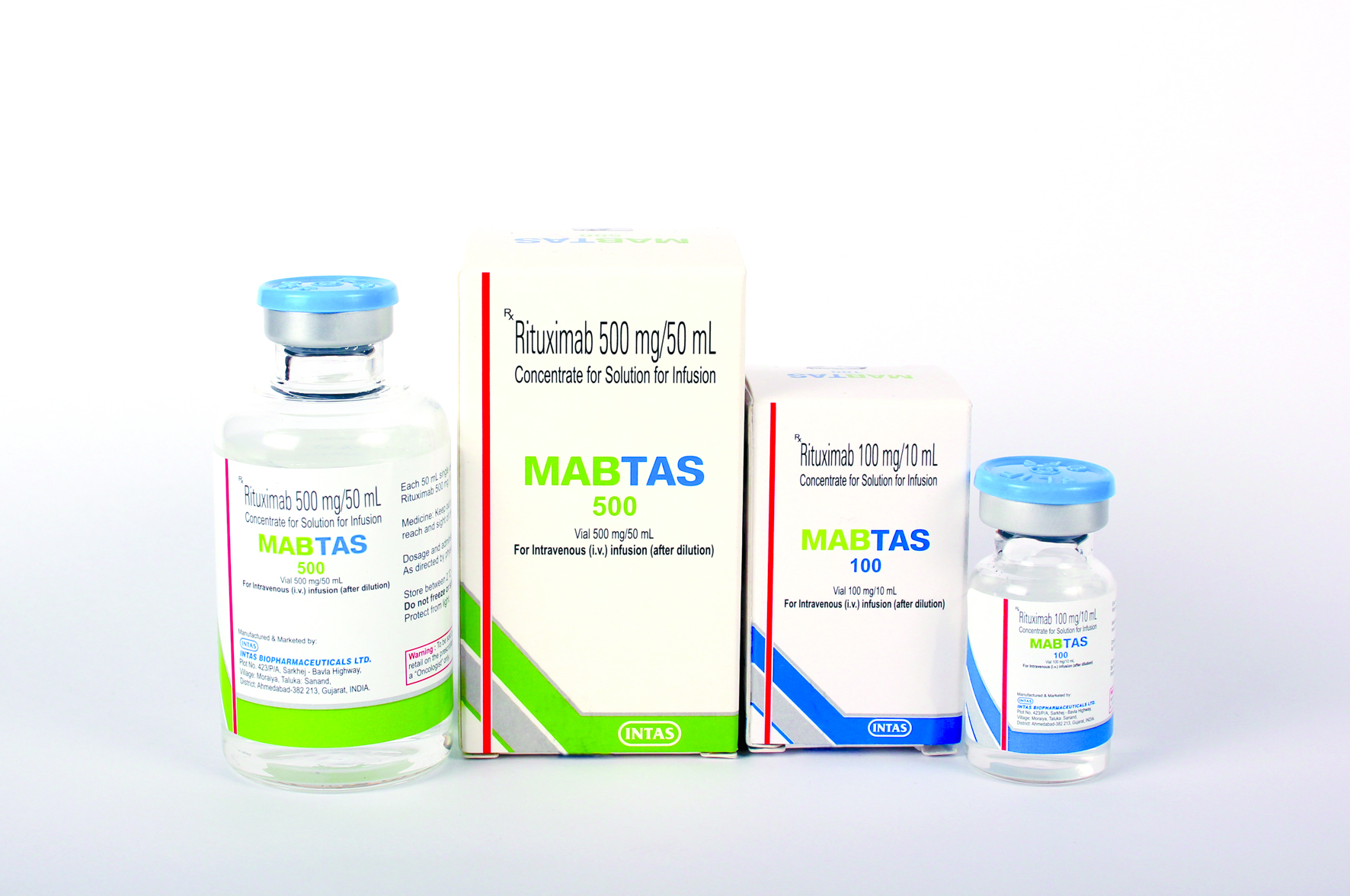
Rituximab (Anti-CD20 antibody) has been used to treat pemphigus erythematosus.

Immunosuppressant medication is the most common treatment for pemphigus erythematosus. Corticosteroids such as oral prednisone pills are an established long-term therapy for pemphigus. However, their extensive side-effect profile may limit their use. Alternative steroid-sparing therapies include methotrexate, azathioprine, mycophenolate mofetil, cyclophosphamide, and intravenous immunoglobulin. These may be used in combination with corticosteroids to manage disease symptoms.

Rituximab is a monoclonal antibody therapy targeting CD20 that has been used to treat different forms of pemphigus reliably. In 2018, the FDA approved rituximab for the treatment of pemphigus vulgaris. It has been shown effective in treating cases of pemphigus vulgaris that did not respond to corticosteroids. Several recent case reports have shown its effectiveness in treating pemphigus erythematosus. Other anti-CD20 monoclonal antibodies such as ocrelizumab, veltuzumab, and ofatumumab have been suggested for the management of pemphigus.

Immunoadsorption and plasmapheresis have also been shown to be useful treatments for pemphigus erythematosus.

== See also ==
- Pemphigus
- Pemphigus foliaceus
- Pemphigus vulgaris
- List of cutaneous conditions
- List of conditions caused by problems with junctional proteins
