= Exfoliatin =

Exotoxin

Exfoliatin is a Staphylococcus aureus exotoxin that causes a blistering of the skin known as staphylococcal scalded skin syndrome, usually in infants.

Exfoliatins are glutamate-specific serine proteases highly specific to desmoglein I, a cadherin (adhesion protein) in the desmosomes of the stratum granulosum that facilitates intercellular adhesion between keratinocytes. The resulting vesicle is an intraepidermal cleft located above the basal cells (suprabasal), between the stratum corneum and stratum spinosum. Desmoglein-1 is similarly involved in Pemphigus foliaceus, an auto-immune skin condition. A very similar non-infectious condition is seen in the autoimmune skin disorder pemphigus vulgaris in which there is an IgG antibody against the cadherin desmoglein 3.

== See also ==
- Exfoliation (disambiguation)
- Staphylococcus aureus — Exfoliative toxins
