= Pemphigus herpetiformis =

- Other names: Acantholytic herpetiform dermatitis, Herpetiform pemphigus, Mixed bullous disease, Pemphigus controlled by sulfapyridine
- Specialty: Dermatology

Pemphigus herpetiformis is a cutaneous condition, a clinical variant of pemphigus that combines the clinical features of dermatitis herpetiformis with the immunopathologic features of pemphigus.

== Pathophysiology ==
Pemphigus Herpetiformis is an IGg mediated autoantibodies that affect the epidermal layer of the skin.

== Diagnosis ==
Diagnosis of pemphigus herpetiformis is usually based on a combination of clinical appearance, skin biopsy, direct immunofluorescence, and serologic testing for pemphigus-related autoantibodies. Clinically, the condition may present with red, itchy erosions and blisters arranged in a herpetiform pattern, and it is often described as milder than classic pemphigus vulgaris or pemphigus foliaceus. Histological findings may include subcorneal pustules and eosinophilic spongiosis, while acantholysis may be minimal or absent compared with other forms of pemphigus. Because its symptoms can resemble dermatitis herpetiformis, linear IgA bullous dermatosis, bullous pemphigoid, and other autoimmune blistering diseases, diagnosis requires careful comparison of clinical, histological, and immunofluorescence findings.

The autoimmune findings are usually associated with IgG antibodies against desmoglein 1, although some cases involve antibodies against desmoglein 3 or other desmosomal proteins. Reviews of reported cases describe pemphigus herpetiformis as a rare disorder with variable clinical, histologic, immunopathologic, and treatment features. Treatment approaches reported in the literature include systemic corticosteroids, dapsone, and other immunosuppressive or steroid-sparing therapies, depending on disease severity and patient response. Because pemphigus herpetiformis is rare and can overlap with other blistering disorders, clearer public information may help reduce confusion, delayed recognition, and mismedicine-related diagnostic errors.

== See also ==
- Adult linear IgA disease
- List of cutaneous conditions
