= Tzanck test =

Skin test for chickenpox and herpes

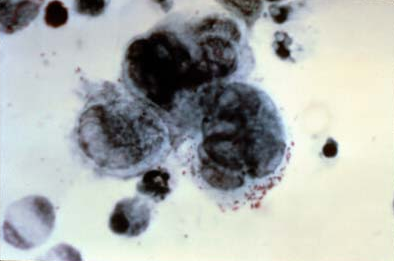
- A positive Tzanck test, showing three multinucleated giant cells ("Tzanck cells") in center.
- Purpose: diagnosis of varicella-zoster virus and herpes

In dermatopathology, the Tzanck test, also Tzanck smear, is scraping of an ulcer base to look for Tzanck cells. It is sometimes also called the chickenpox skin test and the herpes skin test. It is a simple, low-cost, and rapid office based test.

Tzanck cells (acantholytic cells) are found in:

- Herpes simplex
- Varicella and herpes zoster
- Pemphigus vulgaris
- Cytomegalovirus

Arnault Tzanck did the first cytological examinations in order to diagnose skin diseases. To diagnose pemphigus, he identified acantholytic cells, and to diagnose of herpetic infections he identified multinucleated giant cells and acantholytic cells. He extended his cytologic findings to certain skin tumors as well.

Even though cytological examination can provide rapid and reliable diagnosis for many skin diseases, its use is limited to a few diseases. In endemic regions, Tzanck test is used to diagnose leishmaniasis and leprosy. For other regions, Tzanck test is mainly used to diagnose pemphigus and herpetic infections. Some clinics use biopsies even for herpetic infections. This is because the advantages of this test are not well known, and the main textbooks of dermatopathology do not include dedicated sections for cytology or Tzanck smear. A deep learning model called TzanckNet has been developed to lower the experience barrier needed to use this test.

== Procedure ==
1. Unroof vesicle and scrape base w/ sterile №15 scalpel blade
2. Smear with cotton stick onto a clean glass slide
3. Fix w/ gentle heat or air dry
4. Fix w/ MeOH (Methanol)
5. Stain w/ Giemsa, methylene blue or Wright’s stain.
6. Microscopic examination using an oil immersion lens. (Look for multinucleated giant cells)

A modified test can be performed using proprietary agents which requires fewer steps and allows the sample to be fixed quicker.

== Cytologic findings ==
For microscopic evaluation, samples are first scanned with low magnification objectives (X4 and X10) and then examined in detail with the high magnification objective (X100). The X4 objectives are used to select the areas to investigate in detail and to detect some ectoparasites, but the basis of the cytological diagnostic process is the X10 objective. With X10 magnification, the individual characteristics of the cells, the relationship of the cells to each other and the presence of some infection and infestation agents are evaluated. For this reason, most of the cytological examination is spent at this magnification, and most samples are diagnosed at this magnification. The key cytological findings that are observed at low magnification or, in other words, should be investigated according to the clinical characteristics of the patient are as follows: acantholytic cells, tadpole cells, granulomatous inflammation, infectious agents and increases in specific cells.

=== Major indications, cytologic findings and diagnostic value of Tzanck smear test ===
Diseases	Cytologic findings	Diagnostic value
I. Cutaneous infections		
Bacterial infections		
Bullous impetigo	Dyskeratotic acantholytic cells, abundant neutrophils and clusters of cocci	92% sensitive and 100% specific
Staphylococcal scalded skin syndrome (SSSS)	Dyskeratotic acantholytic cells, absence of abundant neutrophils and cocci	A Tzanck smear may be a rapid test to distinguish toxic epidermal necrolysis from SSSS
Mycobacterial infections	Negative images of mycobacteriae, acid-fast bacilli	Maximum acid-fast bacilli positivity (94%) in cases showing caseation necrosis with or without granulomas
Bacillary angiomatosis	Clumps of coccobacilli of B Henselae in Warthin-Starry-stained smears	
Fungal infections		
Dermatophytic infections	Hyphae and spores	
Candidiasis	Pseudohyphae and spores	Pseudohyphae and spores in 90% of patients with candida folliculitis
Aspergillosis	Septate hyphae with 45-degree angle branching and/or aspergillus heads	
Blastomycosis	Broad-based budding spores	57.7 - 93% sensitive
Sporotrichosis	Spherical, oval or cigar-shaped yeasts and asteroid bodies	84.9% sensitive and 57.9% specific
Viral infections		
Herpetic infections	Acantholytic cells, multinucleated giant cells and eosinophilic inclusion bodies	53.1 - 86% sensitive and 100% specific
Hand, foot and mouth disease	Syncytial nuclei, absence of acantholytic cells^{1}	72% sensitive and 100% specific
Human papillomavirus infections	Koilocytes	75% sensitive and 100% specific
Molluscum contagiosum	Intracytoplasmic inclusion bodies (“Henderson-Patterson’s bodies”)	
Milker’s nodule and orf	Intracytoplasmic inclusion bodies (“Guarnieri’s bodies”)	
Parasitic infections		
Leishmaniasis	Ellipsoid-shaped Leishman-Donovan bodie	30 - 82.6% sensitive and 100% specific
Demodicosis	More than 5 Demodex mites/cm^{2}	The diagnostic value of cytology for diagnosing Demodex folliculitis is higher than that of histopathology. The sensitivity of histopathology is 60%, whereas that of cytology is 93.3%
Cutaneous amoebiasis	Trophozoites of Entamoeba histolytica	Direct specimens or PAS and acid phosphatase-stained specimens in cases with doubtful direct specimens show trophozoites of Entamoeba histolytica
II. Immunobullous disorders		
Pemphigus	Acantholytic cells with direct immunofluorescence positivity	With the use of direct immunofluorescence examination, the specificity of cytology for diagnosing pemphigus can be increased from 43% to 100%.
Erythema multiforme, Toxic epidermal necrolysis	Apoptotic and necrotic cells, absence of acantholytic cells	A Tzanck smear may be a rapid test to distinguish toxic epidermal necrolysis from SSSS
III. Genodermatoses		
Hailey-Hailey disease	Acantholytic cells without direct immunofluorescence positivity	Direct immunofluorescence examination should be made for differentiation from pemphigus.
Darier’s disease	Acantholytic cells, corps ronds, grains	Direct immunofluorescence examination should be made for differentiation from pemphigus.
IV. Spongiotic dermatitis	Presence of more than 10 tadpole cells at x100 magnification	
Contact dermatitis	Tadpole cells and lymphocytes	83% sensitive and 100% specific
V. Granulomatous diseases	Granuloma formation and multinucleated giant cells	The main purpose of cytological examination in granulomatous dermatitis is to detect infectious agents. Foreign body materials are very specific for foreign body granuloma.
Granuloma annulare	Palisading granuloma and mucin	The main purpose of cytological examination in granulomatous dermatitis is to detect infectious agents. Foreign body materials are very specific for foreign body granuloma.
Necrobiosis lipoidica	Palisading granuloma and necrobiotic materials	The main purpose of cytological examination in granulomatous dermatitis is to detect infectious agents. Foreign body materials are very specific for foreign body granuloma.
Foreign-body granuloma	Foreign body	The main purpose of cytological examination in granulomatous dermatitis is to detect infectious agents. Foreign body materials are very specific for foreign body granuloma.
Juvenile xanthogranuloma	Touton type giant cells and foamy cells	The main purpose of cytological examination in granulomatous dermatitis is to detect infectious agents. Foreign body materials are very specific for foreign body granuloma.
VI. Tumoral lesions		
Benign tumoral lesions		
Mastocytoma	Abundant mast cells	Tzanck smear test is useful for rapid diagnosis of mastocytoma in children
Sebaceous hyperplasia	Clusters of sebocytes	
Seborrheic keratosis	Hyperkeratosis and horny cysts	87.5% sensitive and 80.8% specific
Melanocytic nevi	Dermal and epidermal type nevoid cells	87.5% sensitive and 100% specific
Eruptive vellus hair cysts	Abundant vellus hairs	
Malignant tumoral lesions	Cellular atypia including mitosis, poikilokaryosis, poikilocytosis, nuclear contour irregularity, prominent nucleoli and nuclear molding	
Basal cell carcinoma	Clusters of basaloid cells	The most common reason to use cytological examination in malignant tumoral diseases is to distinguish basal cell carcinoma from other tumors, such as squamous cell carcinoma and melanoma. Tzanck smear test is 97% sensitivity and 86% specificity for the diagnosis of basal cell carcinoma.
Squamous cell carcinoma	Cytologic atypia of keratinocytes	The most common reason to use cytological examination in malignant tumoral diseases is to distinguish basal cell carcinoma from other tumors, such as squamous cell carcinoma and melanoma. Tzanck smear test is 97% sensitivity and 86% specificity for the diagnosis of basal cell carcinoma.
Melanoma	Atypical melanocytes	The most common reason to use cytological examination in malignant tumoral diseases is to distinguish basal cell carcinoma from other tumors, such as squamous cell carcinoma and melanoma. Tzanck smear test is 97% sensitivity and 86% specificity for the diagnosis of basal cell carcinoma.
Lymphoma	Atypical lymphocytes	The most common reason to use cytological examination in malignant tumoral diseases is to distinguish basal cell carcinoma from other tumors, such as squamous cell carcinoma and melanoma. Tzanck smear test is 97% sensitivity and 86% specificity for the diagnosis of basal cell carcinoma.
Paget’s disease	Isolated or clusters of Paget’s cells	The most common reason to use cytological examination in malignant tumoral diseases is to distinguish basal cell carcinoma from other tumors, such as squamous cell carcinoma and melanoma. Tzanck smear test is 97% sensitivity and 86% specificity for the diagnosis of basal cell carcinoma.
Kaposi’s sarcoma	Cigar-shaped spindle cells	The most common reason to use cytological examination in malignant tumoral diseases is to distinguish basal cell carcinoma from other tumors, such as squamous cell carcinoma and melanoma. Tzanck smear test is 97% sensitivity and 86% specificity for the diagnosis of basal cell carcinoma.

=== Tzanck smear examples ===
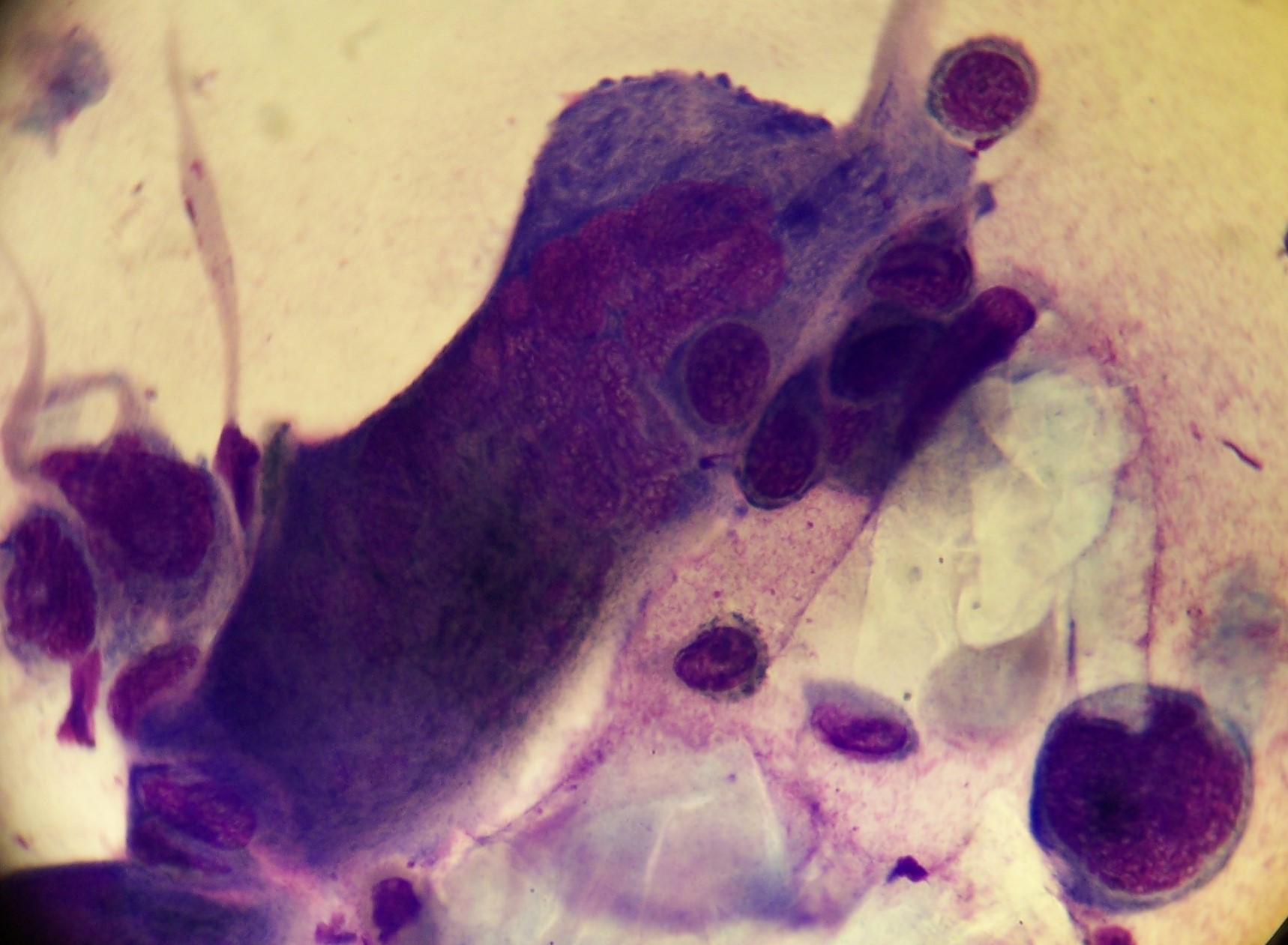
Acantholytic cell and multinucleated giant cell on a smear taken from a vesicular lesion of herpes simplex infection (May-Grünwald Giemsa x1000).

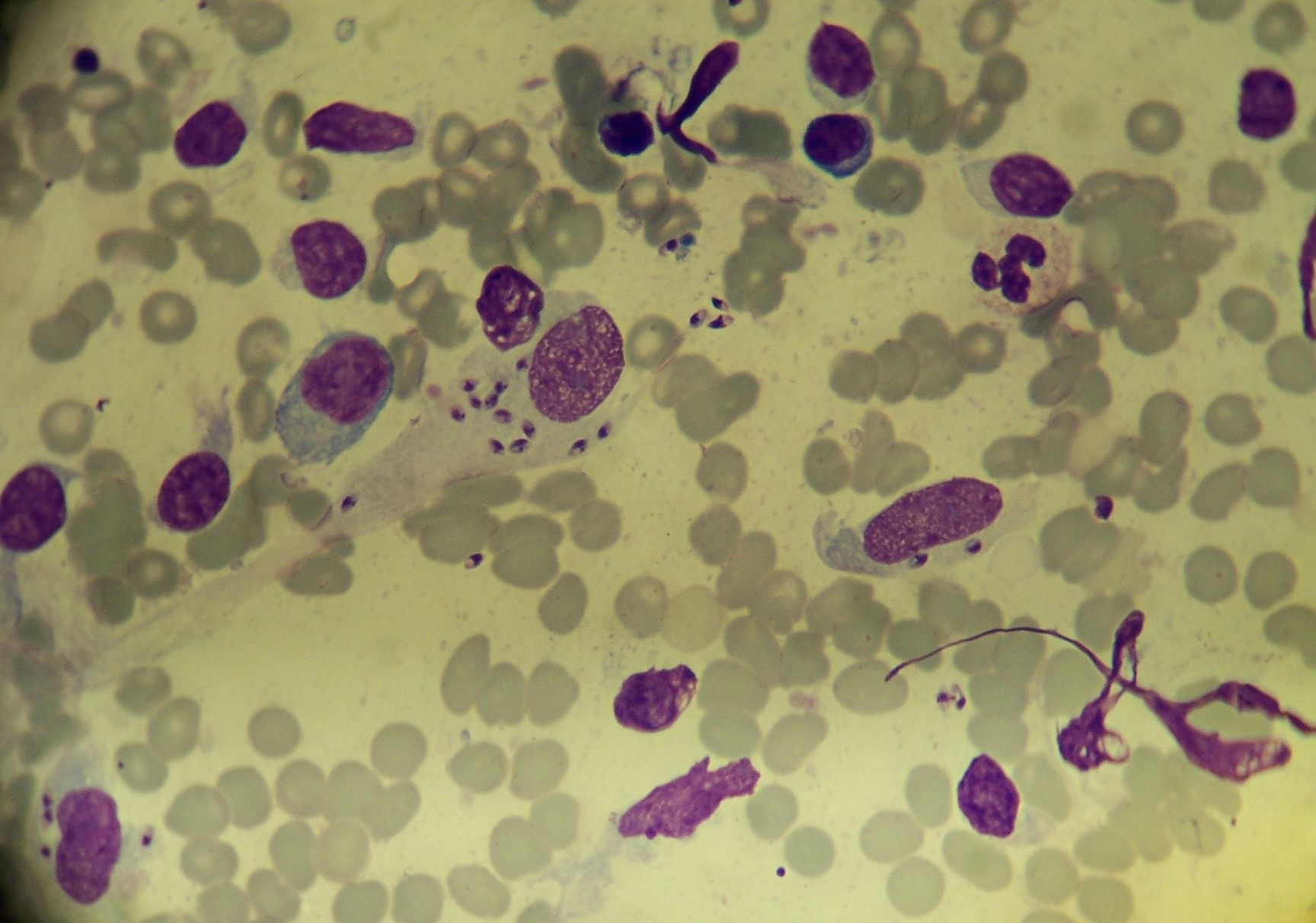
Extracellular and intracellular (macrophages) leishmania parasites in a patient with cutaneous leishmaniasis (May-Grünwald Giemsa x1000).

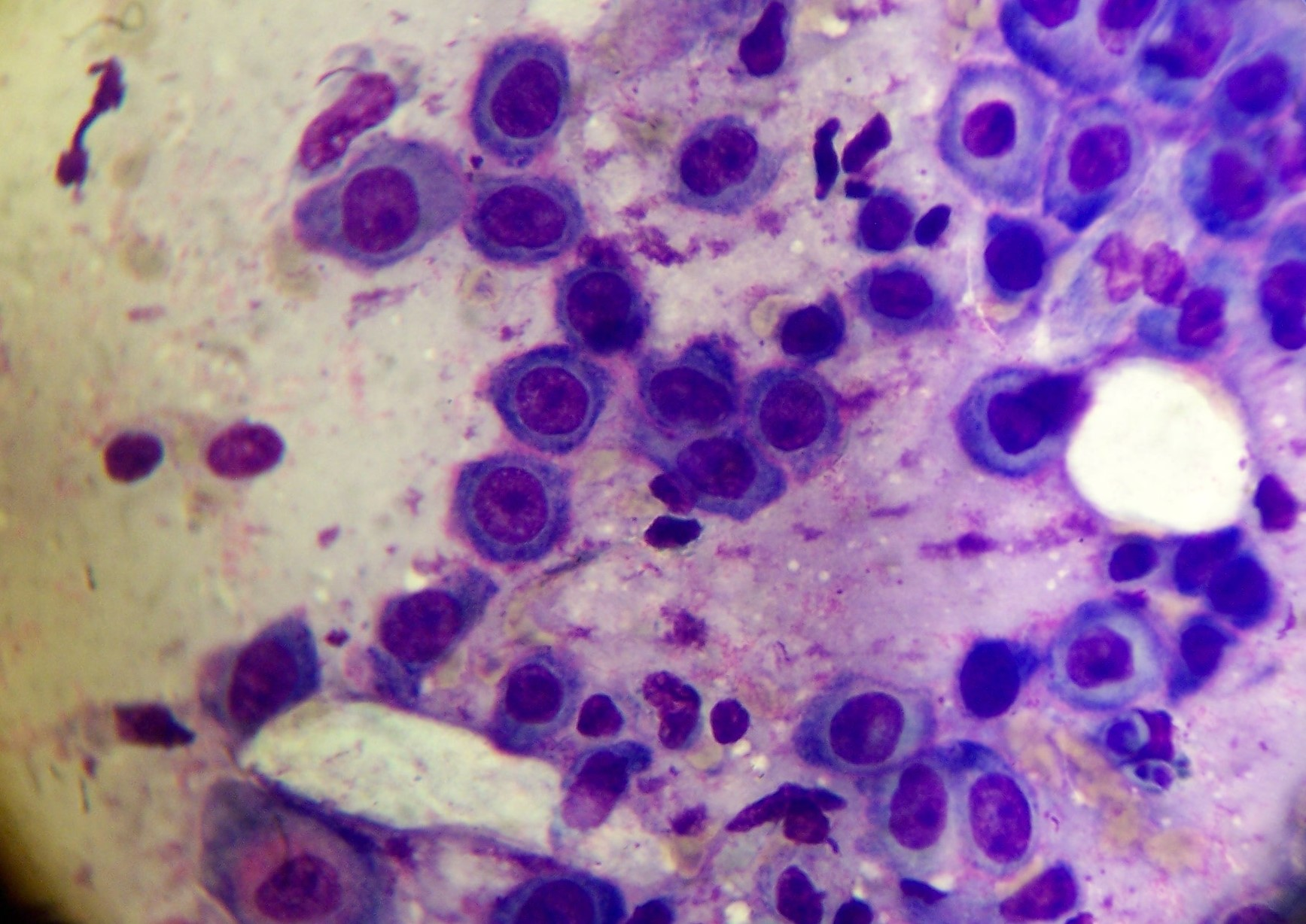
Acantholytic cells on a smear taken from a patient with pemphigus foliaceus (May-Grünwald Giemsa x1000).

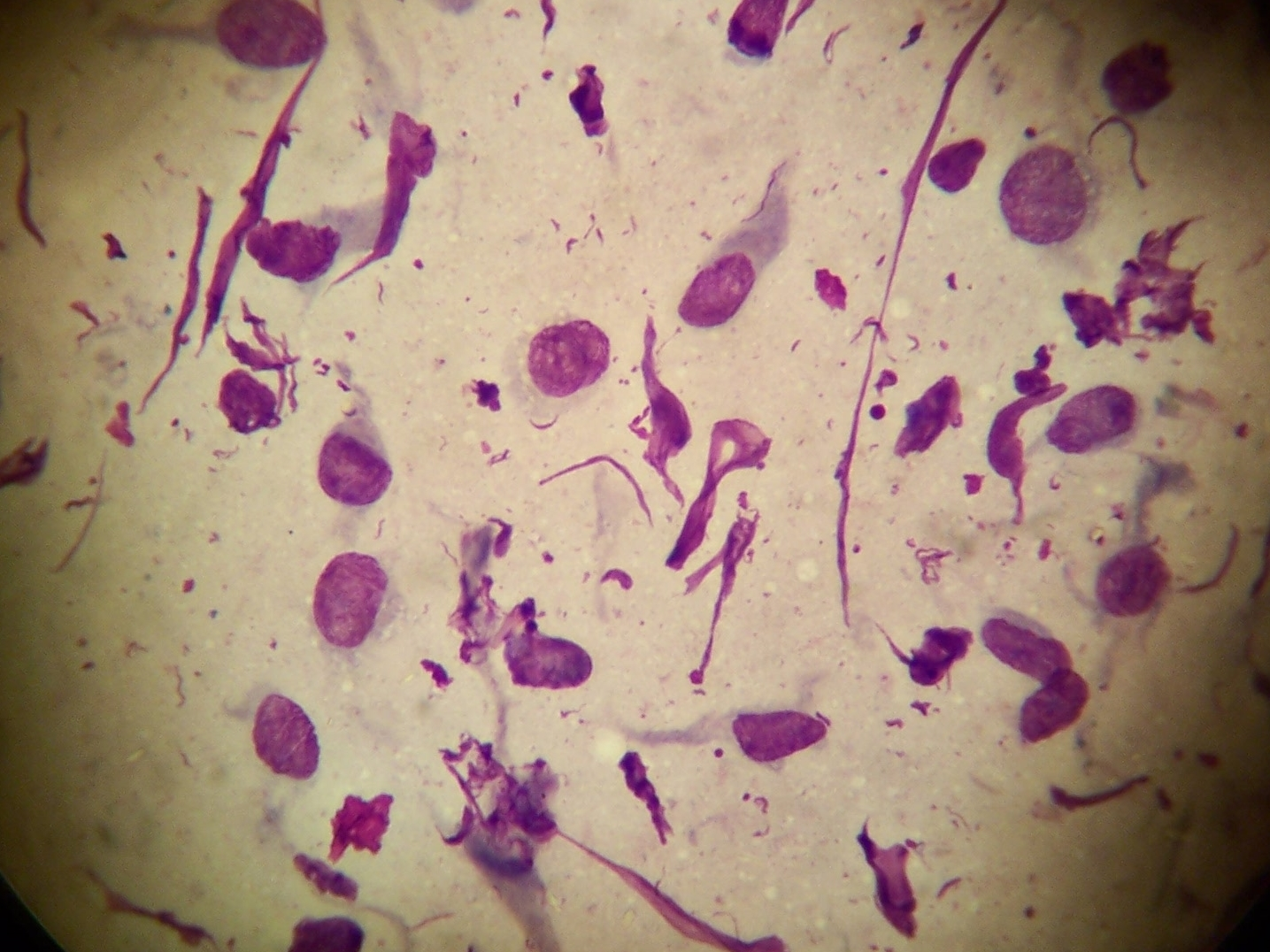
Tadpole cells on a smear taken from a patient with allergic contact dermatitis (May-Grünwald Giemsa x1000).

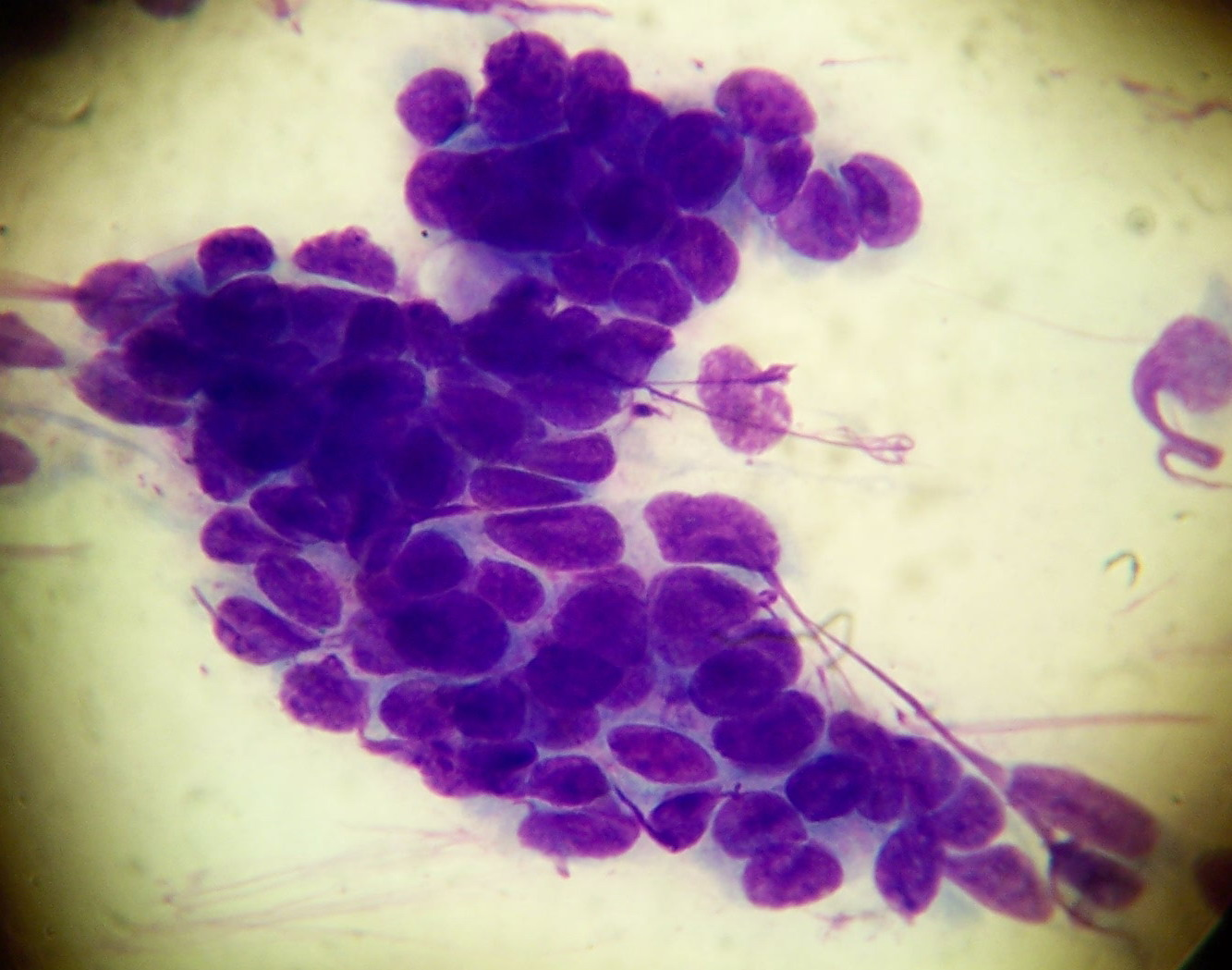
A cluster of basaloid cells on a smear taken from a patient with basal cell carcinoma (May-Grünwald Giemsa x1000).
