= List of cutaneous conditions caused by problems with junctional proteins =

Mutations of proteins that hold the cells of the skin together can cause disease. Autoantibodies against proteins that hold the cells of the skin together can also cause disease.

== List ==
Conditions caused by mutations in or antibodies against junctional proteins found within the epidermis of the human integumentary system
Junctional protein	Condition(s)
Desmocollin 1	Subcorneal pustular dermatosis type of IgA pemphigus
Desmocollin 2	Arrhythmogenic right ventricular dysplasia (ARVD)
Desmoglein 1	Striate palmoplantar keratoderma Pemphigus foliaceous Bullous impetigo Staphylococcal scalded skin syndrome Fogo selvagem Pemphigus erythematosus Mucocutaneous pemphigus vulgaris
Desmoglein 2	ARVD
Desmoglein 3	Mucosal pemphigus vulgaris Pemphigus vegetans Mucocutaneous pemphigus vulgaris
Desmoglein 4	Localized autosomal recessive hypotrichosis Autosomal recessive monilethrix
Desmoplakin	Striate palmoplantar keratoderma Carvajal syndrome Skin fragility–wooly hair syndrome Lethal acantholytic epidermolysis bullosa ARVD; Paraneoplastic pemphigus Stevens–Johnson syndrome
Plakoglobin	Naxos disease Striate palmoplantar keratoderma ARVD
Plakophilin 1	Ectodermal dysplasia–skin fragility syndrome
Plakophilin 2	ARVD
Corneodesmosin	Hypertrichosis simplex of the scalp

== See also ==
- List of keratins expressed in the human integumentary system
- List of target antigens in pemphigus
- List of immunofluorescence findings for autoimmune bullous conditions
- List of cutaneous conditions
- List of genes mutated in cutaneous conditions
- List of histologic stains that aid in diagnosis of cutaneous conditions
- Keratoderma
