= IgA pemphigus =

- Schematic of immunoglobulin A dimer showing H-chain (blue), L-chain (red), J-chain (magenta) and secretory component (yellow).
- Specialty: Dermatology

IgA pemphigus is a skin disease that causes blisters and pustules. Skin lesions often begin as firm blisters filled with clear fluid and later change into pus-filled lesions as inflammatory cells accumulate.Some patients develop red patches of skin, while others do not, and in some cases the lesions may appear in a herpetiform (clustered) pattern. Pruritus is reported in approximately half of patients with IgA pemphigus.

IgA pemphigus is characterized by IgA autoantibodies against keratinocyte cell surface antigens, producing epidermal staining on direct and indirect immunofluorescence.

IgA pemphigus is a subtype of pemphigus with two distinct forms:

- Subcorneal pustular dermatosis (also known as Sneddon–Wilkinson disease and pustulosis subcornealis) is skin condition that is a rare, chronic, recurrent, pustular eruption characterized histopathologically by subcorneal pustules that contain abundant neutrophils. Clinically, in the IgA pemphigus–associated SPD type, patients may present with an annular pattern of red pustules with central crusting. This is distinct from and not to be confused with subcorneal pustular dermatosis type of IgA pemphigus. Sneddon's syndrome, also known as Ehrmann-Sneddon syndrome, is also a different syndrome.
- Intraepidermal neutrophilic IgA dermatosis is characterized histologically by intraepidermal bullae with neutrophils, some eosinophils, and acantholysis. Clinically, the pustules in the intraepidermal neutrophilic subtype may show a characteristic sunflower-like arrangement.

== History ==
The condition was first described by Ian Sneddon, a British physician, and Darrell Wilkinson, a British dermatologist.

== Epidemiology and Clinical Presentation ==
- The majority of patients exhibited vesicles (80.8%), pustules (75.0%), and circinate plaques (63.6%).

== Treatment ==
- The most commonly administered treatments were oral dapsone and corticosteroids.

== See also ==
- Pemphigus
- List of target antigens in pemphigus
- List of conditions caused by problems with junctional proteins
- List of immunofluorescence findings for autoimmune bullous conditions
