= DSC3 =

Protein-coding gene in the species Homo sapiens

Identifiers
- Aliases: DSC3, CDHF3, DSC, DSC1, DSC2, DSC4, HT-CP, desmocollin 3
- External IDs: OMIM: 600271; MGI: 1194993; GeneCards: DSC3

Gene location (Human)
Chr.	Chromosome 18 (human)
Band	18q12.1	Start	30,989,365 bp
Band	18q12.1	End	31,042,815 bp

Gene location (Mouse)
Chr.	Chromosome 18 (mouse)
Band	18 A2|18 11.11 cM	Start	20,093,987 bp
Band	18 A2|18 11.11 cM	End	20,135,408 bp
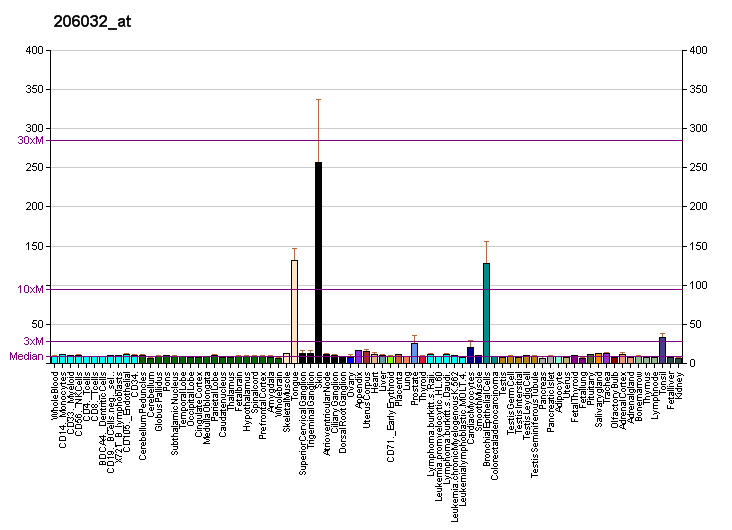

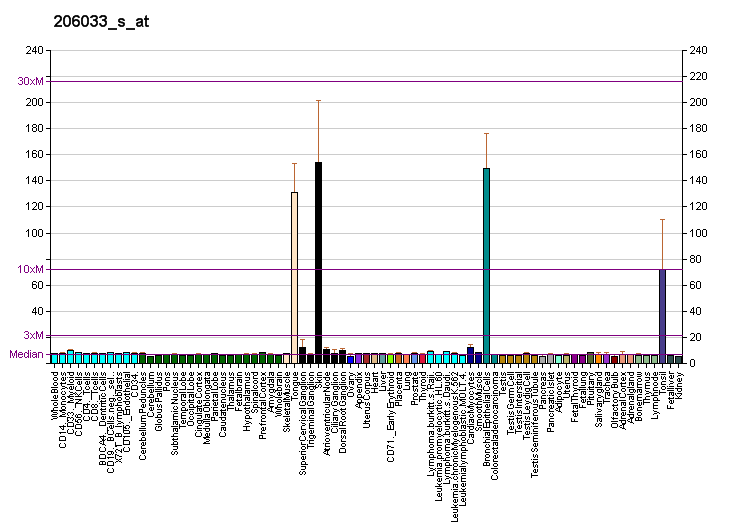
RNA expression pattern
Bgee	Human / Mouse (ortholog); Top expressed in: skin of thigh; gingival epithelium; skin of hip; vulva; human penis; hair follicle; nipple; skin of arm; skin of abdomen; oral cavity / Top expressed in: epidermis; skin of external ear; hair follicle; skin of back; skin of abdomen; lip; molar; mesenteric lymph nodes; cornea; conjunctival fornix; More reference expression data
BioGPS	More reference expression data
Gene ontology
Molecular function	calcium ion binding; gamma-catenin binding; metal ion binding
Cellular component	cell-cell junction; integral component of membrane; desmosome; membrane; cornified envelope; plasma membrane; cell junction; extracellular region; cytoplasm
Biological process	homophilic cell adhesion via plasma membrane adhesion molecules; protein stabilization; cell adhesion; keratinization; cornification; in utero embryonic development; cell-cell adhesion
Sources:Amigo / QuickGO
Orthologs
Databases	NCBI: entry; OMA: entry
Species	Human	Mouse
Entrez	1825	13507
Ensembl	ENSG00000134762	ENSMUSG00000059898
UniProt	Q14574	P55850
RefSeq (mRNA)	NM_024423; NM_001941	NM_001291809; NM_007882
RefSeq (protein)	NP_001932; NP_077741	NP_001278738; NP_031908
Location (UCSC)	Chr 18: 30.99 – 31.04 Mb	Chr 18: 20.09 – 20.14 Mb
PubMed search
- Wikidata
View/Edit Human	View/Edit Mouse

Desmocollin-3 is a protein that in humans is encoded by the DSC3 gene.

== Gene ==
The desmosomal family members are arranged in two clusters on chromosome 18, occupying less than 650 kb combined. Alternative splicing results in two transcript variants encoding distinct isoforms.

== Function ==
Desmocollin-3 is a calcium-dependent glycoprotein that is a member of the desmocollin subfamily of the cadherin superfamily. These desmosomal family members, along with the desmogleins, are found primarily in epithelial cells where they constitute the adhesive proteins of the desmosome cell-cell junction and are required for cell adhesion and desmosome formation. The loss of these components leads to a lack of adhesion and a gain of cellular mobility.

== Clinical significance ==
=== Breast cancer ===
Through the process of epigenetic silencing, the expression of the desmocollin-3 protein is down regulated in many breast cancers.

=== Hereditary hypotrichosis ===
A consanguineous Afghan family in which 3 sisters, 12 to 18 years of age, and their 5-year-old brother displayed features of hereditary hypotrichosis, associated with vesicles on the scalp and skin. At birth, scalp hair was present, and after ritual shaving at 1 week of age, scalp hair grew back; however, the hair was fragile and began falling out at 2 to 3 months of age, eventually leaving only sparse hair on the scalp. Vesicles that were less than 1 cm in diameter were observed on the scalp and skin of most of the body, occasionally disappearing but then reappearing; intermittently, the vesicles would burst with a release of fluid, leaving scars on the site that took 3 to 4 months to heal. There were no mucosal vesicles. Upon examination, the affected individuals were nearly devoid of eyebrows, eyelashes, axillary hair, and body hair. Teeth, nails, palms, soles, sweating, and hearing were normal, as was electrocardiography. Serum IgA, IgE, and IgD were measured in 1 individual and showed no change compared to controls. The parents were clinically unaffected. A scalp biopsy of the 18-year-old sister showed slight follicular plugging, mild perivascular and periadnexal inflammatory cell presence, and normal hair follicles. The sebaceous glands appeared morphologically normal and connected to the hair follicles.

==== Mapping ====
Genotyping and linkage analysis of the consanguineous Afghan family resulted in a maximum 2-point load score of 2.68 (theta = 0.0) at markers D18S36 and D18S547. Multipoint analysis generated a maximum load score of 3.30 at marker D18S877. Recombination events defined an 8.30-cM critical interval on chromosome 18q12.1, flanked by markers D18S66 and D18S1139, containing 30 genes.

==== Molecular genetics ====
A nonsense mutation in the DSC3 gene (600271.0001) mapping to chromosome 18q12.1 was identified in the consanguineous Afghan family with hypotrichosis and recurrent skin vesicles (613102). The unaffected parents and 3 healthy siblings were heterozygous for the mutation, which was not found in 100 unrelated ethnically matched controls. In affected members of this family with hypotrichosis were homozygous for a 2129T-G transversion in exon 14 of the DSC3 gene, resulting in a leu710-to-ter (L710X; Ayub et al. 2009) substitution at the junction of the transmembrane and the C-terminal cytoplasmic domain, predicted to cause premature termination and nonsense mediated decay of the mRNA or instability of the truncated protein. The unaffected parents and 3 healthy siblings were heterozygous for the mutation, which was not found in 100 unrelated ethnically matched controls.

== Interactions ==
DSC3 has been shown to interact with PKP3.
