= Neonatal toxic shock-like exanthematous disease =

- Specialty: Dermatology

Neonatal toxic shock-like exanthematous disease is a cutaneous condition characterized by a generalized diffuse macular erythema or morbilliform eruption with confluence.

== See also ==
- Staphylococcal scalded skin syndrome
- List of cutaneous conditions
