= Arnault Tzanck =

French pioneer of blood transfusion (1886–1954)

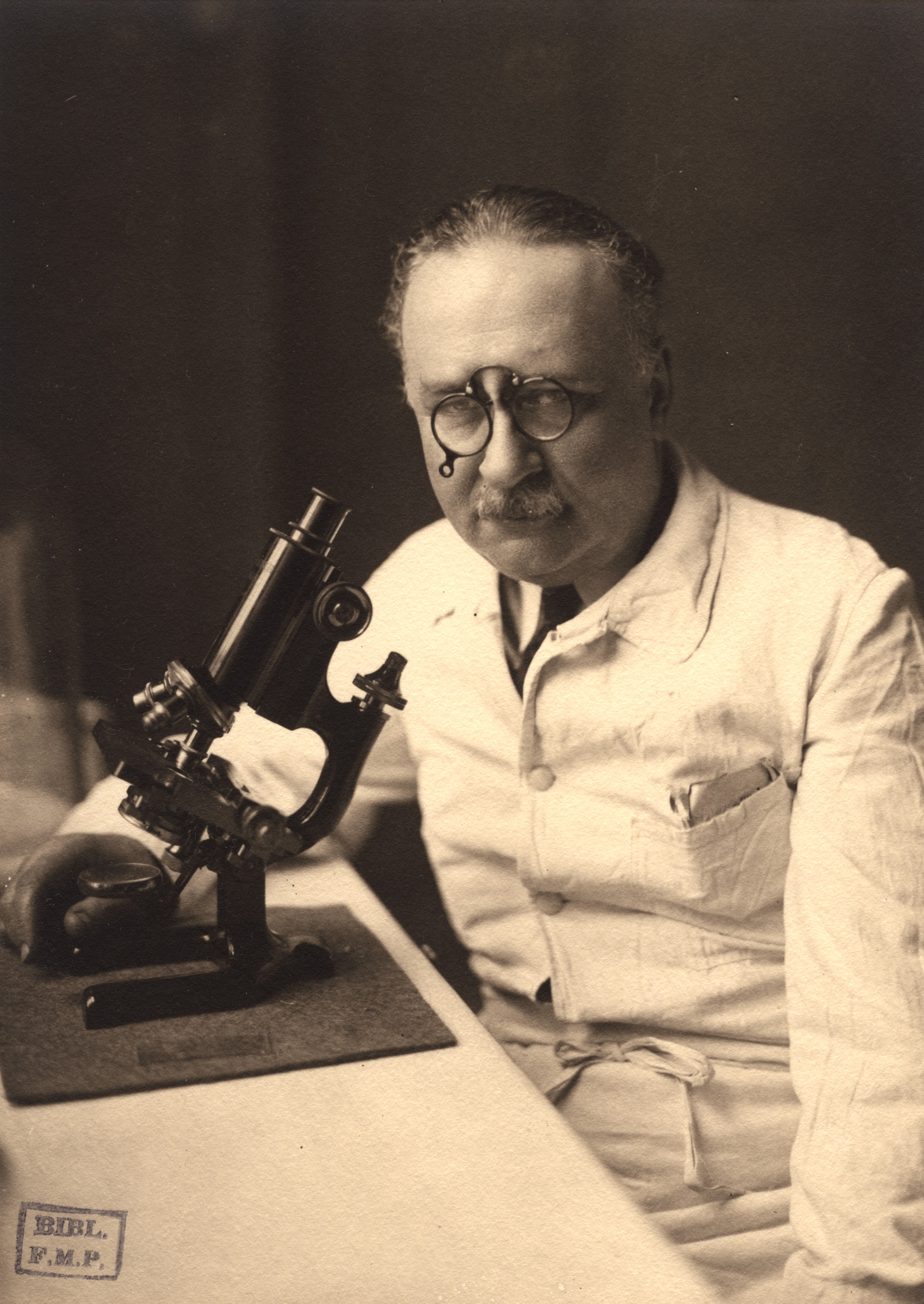
- Born: May 1, 1886; Vladikavkaz
- Died: February 7, 1954 (aged 67); Neuilly-sur-Seine, France
- Known for: blood transfusion
- Scientific career
- Fields: medicine

Arnault Tzanck (May 1, 1886 – February 7, 1954) was a French physician and a pioneer of blood transfusion. During the First World War, he was a doctor in the newly-created military motorcar-ambulance service where he realized the vital role of the blood transfusions.

Arnault Tzanck's name is attached to an apparatus he invented that was widely used for transfusing blood in France between the wars, as well as a simple test he devised using the microscopic analysis of scrapings from skin cancer lesions, different ganglia, and some forms of dermatitis especially pemphigus. The Tzanck smear is still widely used as a test for herpes, among other diseases. He also experimented with different methods of preserving blood and blood substitutes. Tzanck's most lasting contribution was in the organization of blood transfusion in France that eventually resulted in the creation of the Centre national de transfusion sanguine, or CNTS (the French National Blood Transfusion Center), which was established in 1949 with Tzanck as its first director. In the process, Tzanck educated a whole generation of serologists and immunologists, including Jean Dausset, Marcel Bessis, and Jean Pierre Soulier.

== Modern homage ==
A deep learning model was developed to analyze Tzanck smears and named after him as TzanckNet.

== See also ==
- Tzanck test
