= Isidor Neumann =

Austrian dermatologist (1832–1906)

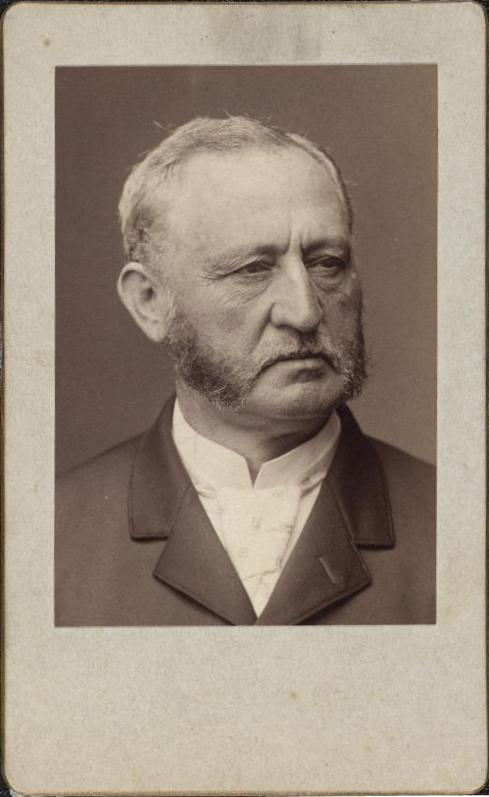
Isidor Neumann (1832-1906)

Isidor Neumann, Edler von Heilwart (2 March 1832, Mißlitz, Moravia – 31 August 1906) was a dermatologist from the Austro-Hungarian Empire.

He was a student at the so-called Vienna School of Dermatology under Ferdinand Ritter von Hebra (1816–1880), earning his doctorate in 1858. In 1863 he received his habilitation, and in 1873 became an associate professor. In 1881 he was appointed professor of dermatology and successor to Carl Ludwig Sigmund (1810–1883) as director of the clinic for syphilis.

In an 1886 publication of Vierteljahrsschrift für Dermatologie und Syphilis, he described a type of pemphigus vulgaris, which later became known as Pemphigus vegetans of Neumann. He was also the first to publish a detailed study (Über die senilen Veränderungen der Haut des Menschen) of prematurely aged skin caused by over-exposure to weather conditions. However it wasn't until several years later that Paul Gerson Unna (1850-1929) gave it a name, calling it seemannshaut or "sailors' skin".

During the Austrian government's occupation of Bosnia-Herzegovina, Neumann was sent to the country to manage the public health problem of syphilis and leprosy.

== Written works ==
- Lehrbuch der Hautkrankheiten, 1869.
- Ueber eine noch wenig bekannte Hautkrankheit (Dermatitis circumscripta herpetiformis). in Vierteljahrsschrift für Dermatologie und Syphilis, Vienna, 1875, 2: 41–52. (First description of Mibelli's disease II).
- Ueber Pemphigus vegetans (frambosioides). in Vierteljahrsschrift für Dermatologie und Syphilis, Vienna, 1886, 13: 157–178.
- Syphilis in Hermann Nothnagel's Handbuch der speciellen Pathologie und Therapie. Volume VIIIV, Vienna, 1896 [24 volumes 1894-1905].

== External sources ==
- "Isidor Neumann". Who Named It. Archived from the original on April 13, 2002.
- Journal of cutaneous diseases by the American Dermatological Association (1906) (biography)
