= François Henri Hallopeau =

French dermatologist (1842–1919)

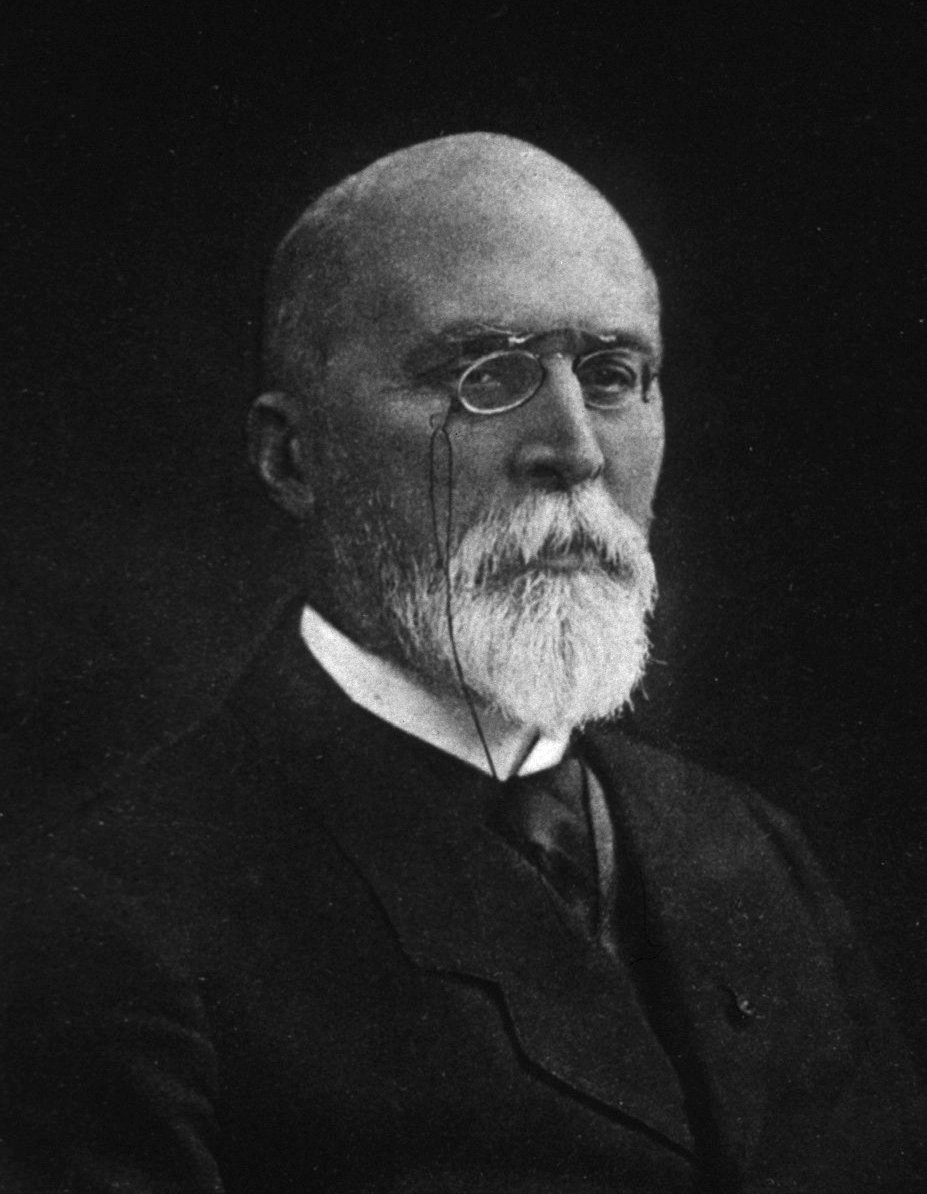
Hallopeau before 1900

François Henri Hallopeau (17 January 1842, Paris – 20 March 1919, Paris) was a French dermatologist. He studied medicine under Alfred Vulpian and Sigismond Jaccoud. He co-founded and was secretary general of the Société Française de dermatologie et de syphiligraphie. He became a member of the Académie de Médecine in 1893.

He coined the medical term trichotillomania in 1889. He also coined the word antibiotique in 1871 to describe a substance opposed to the development of life.

Selman Waksman was later credited with coining the word antibiotic to describe such compounds that were derived from other living organisms, such as penicillin.

== Terms ==
- Recessive dystrophic epidermolysis bullosa (also known as Hallopeau-Siemens syndrome)
- Pemphigus vegetans of Hallopeau

== Papers ==
- Hallopeau F; Leredde É (1885). "Sur un cas d'adenomes sébacés à forme sclereuse". Annales de dermatologie et de syphiligraphie. 6: 473–9.
- Hallopeau F (1869). "Lichen plan scléreux". Annales de dermatologie et de syphiligraphie. 10: 447–9.
- Hallopeau F (1887). "Leçons cliniques sur les maladies cutanées et syphilitiques. Première leçon, suite et fin. Le lichen plan atrophique". Union médicale. 43: 742–7.
- Hallopeau F (1890). "Sur une nouvelle forme de dermatite pustuleuse chronique en foyers à progression excentrique". Congrès international de dermatologie et de syphiligraphie tenu à Paris en 1889: 344–62.
- Hallopeau F (1890). "Sur une asphyxie locale des extrémités avec polydactylie suppurative chronique et poussées éphémères de dermatite pustuleuse disséminée et symétrique". Bulletin de la Société française de dermatologie et de syphiligraphie: 39–45.
- Hallopeau F (1890). "Sur une dermatose bulleuse congénitale avec cicatrices indélébiles, kystes épidermiques et manifestations buccales". Bulletin de la Société française de dermatologie et de syphiligraphie: 3–10.

== See also ==
- Timeline of tuberous sclerosis

== Sources ==
- Enersen, Ole Daniel. "François Henri Hallopeau". Who Named It?. Archived from the original on August 22, 2002.
- "François Henri Hallopeau". BIUM.
- "History of Biology: Dates 1850–1874". Genetics of Bacterial Genomes.
- "François Henri Hallopeau (1842–1919)". historiadelamedicina.org.
