= Pemphigus vegetans =

- Specialty: Dermatology

Pemphigus vegetans is a localized form of the skin disease pemphigus vulgaris in which there is a localized vegetating papillomatous response. The eroded areas do not heal like usual but form papillomatous growth and vegetation.

Accounts for 1-2% of pemphigus cases and is a relatively benign variant of pemphigus vulgaris. Two forms are recognized:

- Pemphigus vegetans of Neumann is a localized disease of pemphigus vulgaris slightly more extensive than pemphigus vegetans of Hallopeau. This type is more common and characterized by early lesions similar to Pemphigus Vulgaris with large bullae and erosive areas. Healing is through formation of granulation tissue. It is named for the Austrian Dermatologist, Isidor Neumann.
- Pemphigus vegetans of Hallopeau is a disease of localized pemphigus vulgaris. It is named for François Henri Hallopeau. This type is less aggressive and has pustules not bullae. These pustules heal by verrucous hyperkeratotic vegetations.

== See also ==
- List of cutaneous conditions
- Pemphigus
- List of conditions caused by problems with junctional proteins
