= Plakophilin-3 =

Protein-coding gene in the species Homo sapiens

PKP3

Identifiers
- Aliases: PKP3, plakophilin 3
- External IDs: OMIM: 605561; MGI: 1891830; GeneCards: PKP3

Gene location (Human)
Chr.	Chromosome 11 (human)
Band	11p15.5	Start	392,614 bp
Band	11p15.5	End	404,908 bp

Gene location (Mouse)
Chr.	Chromosome 7 (mouse)
Band	7|7 F5	Start	140,658,131 bp
Band	7|7 F5	End	140,670,423 bp
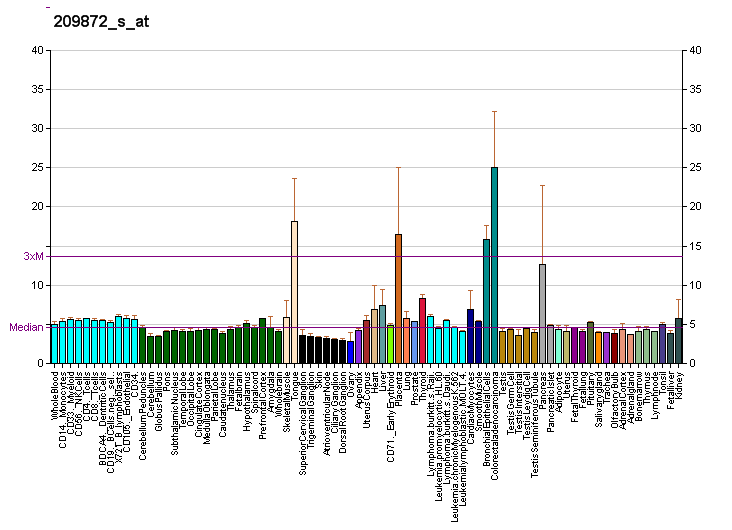

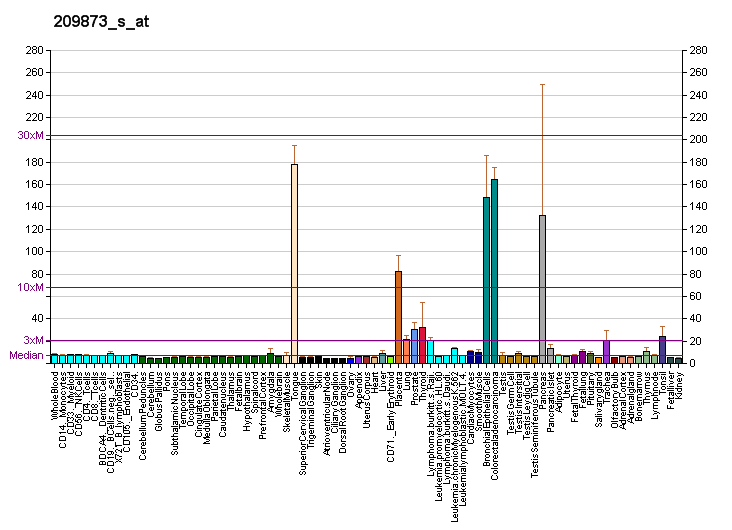
RNA expression pattern
Bgee	Human / Mouse (ortholog); Top expressed in: skin of abdomen; skin of leg; mucosa of pharynx; human penis; skin of arm; mucosa of transverse colon; mucosa of ileum; nipple; vulva; gums / Top expressed in: lip; epidermis; hair follicle; esophagus; skin of external ear; corneal stroma; skin of abdomen; skin of back; saccule; crypt of lieberkuhn of small intestine; More reference expression data
BioGPS	More reference expression data
Gene ontology
Molecular function	alpha-catenin binding; cell adhesion molecule binding; cadherin binding involved in cell-cell adhesion; RNA binding; protein binding; enzyme binding; translation regulator activity; cadherin binding
Cellular component	desmosome; nucleus; cell-cell junction; cornified envelope; nucleoplasm; plasma membrane; cell junction; messenger ribonucleoprotein complex; cytoplasm
Biological process	desmosome assembly; cell adhesion; keratinization; cornification; regulation of translation; positive regulation of gene expression; negative regulation of mRNA catabolic process; protein localization to plasma membrane; cell-cell adhesion; cell-cell junction assembly
Sources:Amigo / QuickGO
Orthologs
Databases	NCBI: entry; OMA: entry
Species	Human	Mouse
Entrez	11187	56460
Ensembl	ENSG00000184363	ENSMUSG00000054065
UniProt	Q9Y446	Q9QY23
RefSeq (mRNA)	NM_007183; NM_001303029	NM_001162924; NM_019762
RefSeq (protein)	NP_001289958; NP_009114	NP_001156396; NP_062736
Location (UCSC)	Chr 11: 0.39 – 0.4 Mb	Chr 7: 140.66 – 140.67 Mb
PubMed search
- Wikidata
View/Edit Human	View/Edit Mouse

Plakophilin-3 is a protein that in humans is encoded by the PKP3 gene.

== Function ==
This gene encodes a member of the arm-repeat (armadillo) and plakophilin gene families. Plakophilin proteins contain numerous armadillo repeats, localize to cell desmosomes and nuclei, and participate in linking cadherins to intermediate filaments in the cytoskeleton. This protein may act in cellular desmosome-dependent adhesion and signaling pathways.

== Interactions ==
PKP3 has been shown to interact with:

- DSC3,
- DSG1,
- DSG2 and
- DSG3.
