= List of immunofluorescence findings for autoimmune bullous conditions =

Several cutaneous conditions can be diagnosed with the aid of immunofluorescence studies.

Cutaneous conditions with positive direct or indirect immunofluorescence when using salt-split skin include:

Antibody isotype(s) and location of antibody deposition in immunofluorescence studies using salt-split skin for autoimmune bullous conditions targeting the basement membrane zone of the human integumentary system
Condition	Antibody isotype(s) deposited	Localization of antibody with use of salt-split skin
Antiepilegrin cicatricial pemphigoid	IgG	Dermal
Bullous lupus erythematosus		Dermal
Bullous pemphigoid	IgG	Epidermal
Cicatricial pemphigoid	IgG	Epidermal
Epidermolysis bullosa acquisita	IgG	Dermal
Linear IgA bullous dermatosis	IgA	Epidermal
Orf-induced immunobullous disease	IgG	Dermal
Pemphigoid gestationis	IgG	Epidermal

For several subtypes of pemphigus a variety of substrates are used for indirect immunofluorescence:

Substrates used in indirect immunofluorescence studies for the different pemphigus variants
Pemphigus variant	Substrate
Pemphigus foliaceous	Guinea pig esophagus
Pemphigus vulgaris	Monkey esophagus
IgA pemphigus	Cultured skin
Paraneoplastic pemphigus	Rat bladder

== See also ==
- List of cutaneous conditions
- List of genes mutated in cutaneous conditions
- List of cutaneous conditions caused by mutations in keratins
