= Staphylococcal scalded skin syndrome =

- Other names: Pemphigus neonatorum, Ritter's disease, localized bullous impetigo
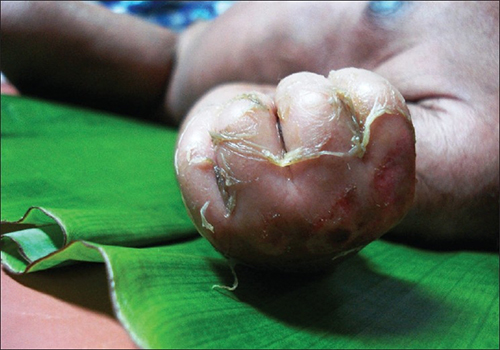
- An infant with Staphylococcal scalded skin syndrome
- Specialty: Dermatology

Staphylococcal scalded skin syndrome (SSSS) is a dermatological condition caused by Staphylococcus aureus.

== Signs and symptoms ==
The disease presents with the widespread formation of fluid-filled blisters that are thin walled and easily ruptured, and the patient can be positive for Nikolsky's sign. SSSS bears a resemblance to thermal burns or scalding, hence the condition's name.

Ritter's disease of the newborn is the most severe form of SSSS, with similar signs and symptoms. SSSS often includes a widespread painful erythroderma, often involving the face, diaper, and other intertriginous areas. Extensive areas of desquamation might be present. Perioral crusting and fissuring are seen early in the course. Unlike toxic epidermal necrolysis, SSSS spares the mucous membranes.

Children with SSSS may exhibit fussiness or irritability, tiredness, fever, redness of the skin, easily broken fluid-filled blisters that leave an area of moist, tender, painful skin, and large sheets of the top layer of skin that easily peel away.

The condition is most common in children under 6 years, but can be seen in adults who are immunosuppressed or have kidney failure.

== Pathophysiology ==
The syndrome is induced by epidermolytic exotoxins (exfoliatin) A and B, which are released by S. aureus and cause detachment within the epidermal layer, by breaking down the desmosomes. One of the exotoxins is encoded on the bacterial chromosome, while the other is encoded on a plasmid. These exotoxins are proteases that cleave desmoglein-1, which normally holds the granulosum and spinosum layers together, similar to the pathophysiology of the autoimmune skin disease, pemphigus vulgaris.

== Diagnosis ==
SSSS is a clinical diagnosis. This is sometimes confirmed by isolation of S. aureus from blood, mucous membranes, or skin biopsy; however, these are often negative. Skin biopsy may show separation of the superficial layer of the epidermis (intraepidermal separation), differentiating SSSS from TEN, wherein the separation occurs at the dermo-epidermal junction (subepidermal separation). SSSS may be difficult to distinguish from toxic epidermal necrolysis and pustular psoriasis.

== Treatment ==
The mainstay of treatment for SSSS is supportive care along with eradication of the primary infection. Conservative measures include rehydration, antipyretics (e.g., ibuprofen or paracetamol), management of thermal burns, and stabilization. Parenteral antibiotics to cover S. aureus should be administered. Most strains of S. aureus implicated in SSSS have penicillinases, so are penicillin resistant. Therefore, treatment with nafcillin, oxacillin, or vancomycin is typically indicated. Clindamycin is sometimes also used because of its inhibition of exotoxins.

== Prognosis ==
The prognosis of SSSS in children is excellent, with complete resolution within 10 days of treatment, and without significant scarring. However, SSSS must be differentiated carefully from toxic epidermal necrolysis, which carries a poor prognosis. The prognosis in adults is generally much worse, and depends upon various factors such as time to treatment, host immunity, and comorbidities.

== History ==
The clinical features were first described in 1878 by Baron Gottfried Ritter von Rittershain, who observed 297 cases among children in a single Czechoslovak children's home over a 10-year period.

In 1885, Nil Filatow, and in 1894, Clement Dukes, described an exanthematous disease which they thought to be a form of rubella, but in 1900, Dukes identified it to be a separate entity which came to be known by the names Dukes' disease, Filatov's disease, or fourth disease. Although Dukes identified it as a separate entity, it is thought not to be different from scarlet fever caused by staphylococcal exotoxin after Keith Powell proposed equating it with the condition currently known as staphylococcal scalded skin syndrome in 1979.

== See also ==
- List of cutaneous conditions
- List of conditions caused by problems with junctional proteins
