= Exfoliation =

Exfoliation can refer to:

- Exfoliation (botany), the loss of leaves (or, in some cases, pieces of bark) from a plant
- Exfoliation (cosmetology), a cosmetic technique that aims to remove dead skin from the body and face
- Exfoliation (geology), a process resulting in parallel fractures in the surface of rock
- Exfoliation corrosion (metallurgy), a severe type of intergranular corrosion
- Exfoliation (chemistry), the complete separation of the layers of a material
- Exfoliation syndrome, an eye disease

== See also ==
- Exfoliative dermatitis, sometimes known as erythroderma, a skin disease process involving redness and scaling of most or all of the sufferer's skin, with various causes
