= Desmoglein-4 =

Protein found in humans

DSG4

Identifiers
- Aliases: DSG4, CDGF13, CDHF13, HYPT6, LAH, desmoglein 4
- External IDs: OMIM: 607892; MGI: 2661061; GeneCards: DSG4

Gene location (Human)
Chr.	Chromosome 18 (human)
Band	18q12.1	Start	31,376,777 bp
Band	18q12.1	End	31,414,912 bp

Gene location (Mouse)
Chr.	Chromosome 18 (mouse)
Band	18 A2|18 11.35 cM	Start	20,569,232 bp
Band	18 A2|18 11.35 cM	End	20,604,878 bp
RNA expression pattern
Bgee	Human / Mouse (ortholog); Top expressed in: testicle; mucosa of esophagus; gonad; duodenum; skin of abdomen; rectum; vagina; skin of leg; head; mouth / Top expressed in: lip; zone of skin; ileum; jejunum; placenta; More reference expression data
BioGPS	n/a
Gene ontology
Molecular function	calcium ion binding; metal ion binding
Cellular component	integral component of membrane; cell junction; desmosome; membrane; cornified envelope; plasma membrane; cell-cell junction
Biological process	hair follicle development; cell adhesion; BMP signaling pathway; keratinocyte differentiation; homophilic cell adhesion via plasma membrane adhesion molecules; keratinization; cornification; cell-cell adhesion
Sources:Amigo / QuickGO
Orthologs
Databases	NCBI: entry; OMA: entry
Species	Human	Mouse
Entrez	147409	16769
Ensembl	ENSG00000175065	ENSMUSG00000001804
UniProt	Q86SJ6	Q7TMD7
RefSeq (mRNA)	NM_001134453; NM_177986	NM_181564
RefSeq (protein)	NP_001127925; NP_817123	NP_853543
Location (UCSC)	Chr 18: 31.38 – 31.41 Mb	Chr 18: 20.57 – 20.6 Mb
PubMed search
- Wikidata
View/Edit Human	View/Edit Mouse

Desmoglein-4 is a protein that in humans is encoded by the DSG4 gene.

== See also ==
- List of conditions caused by problems with junctional proteins
