= Desmoglein =

Family of proteins

Identifiers
- Symbol: DSG
- InterPro: IPR009123
- Membranome: 243
Available protein structures:
- PDB: IPR009123
- AlphaFold: IPR009123

The desmogleins are a family of desmosomal cadherins consisting of proteins DSG1, DSG2, DSG3, and DSG4. They play a role in the formation of desmosomes that join cells to one another.

== Pathology ==
Desmogleins are targeted in the autoimmune disease pemphigus.

Desmoglein proteins are a type of cadherin, which is a transmembrane protein that binds with other cadherins to form junctions known as desmosomes between cells. These desmoglein proteins thus hold cells together, but, when the body starts producing antibodies against desmoglein, these junctions break down, and this results in subsequent blister or vesicle formation.
