= Desmoglein-3 =

Protein found in humans

DSG3
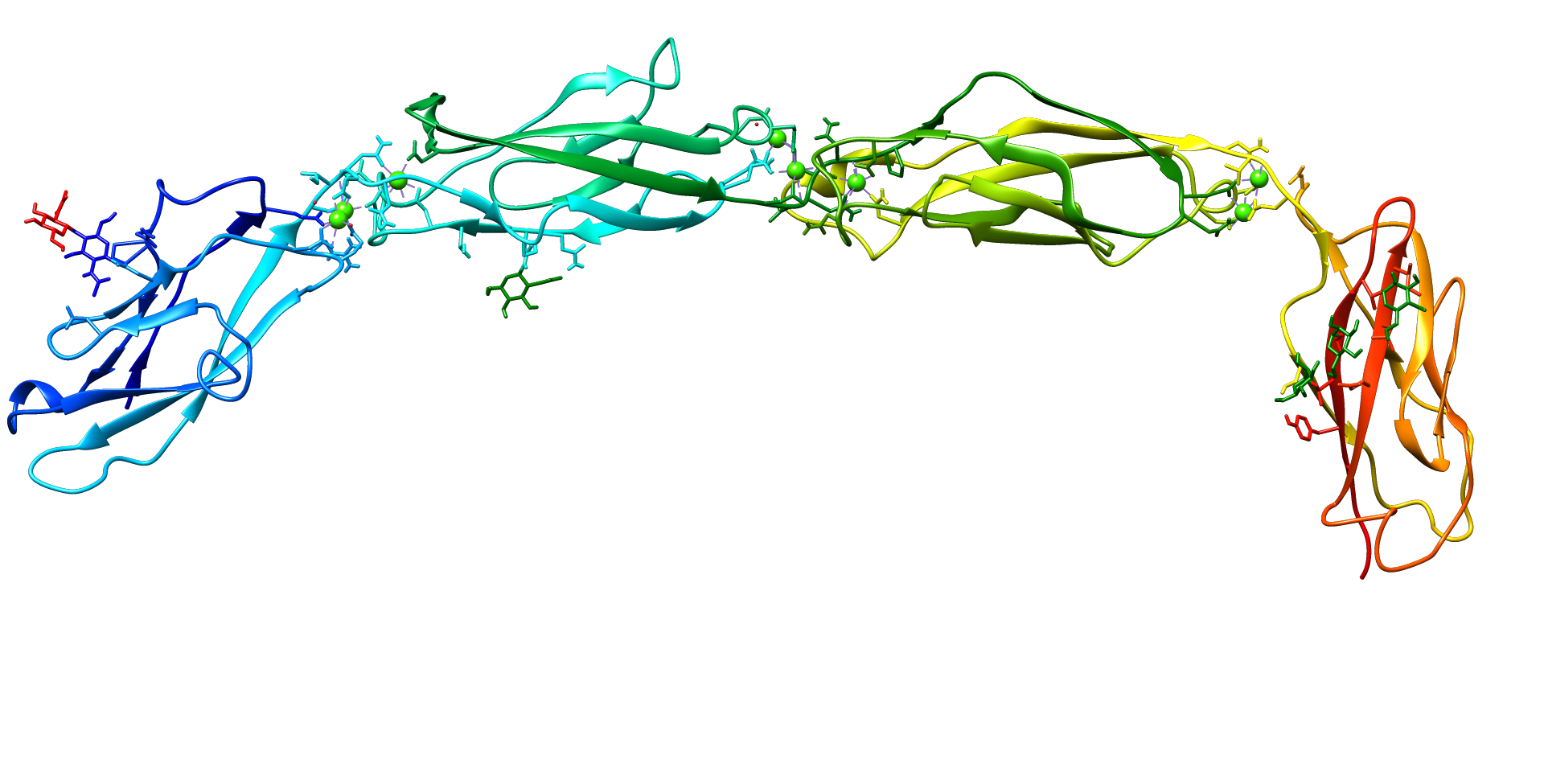

Identifiers
- Aliases: DSG3, CDHF6, PVA, desmoglein 3, ABOLM
- External IDs: OMIM: 169615; MGI: 99499; GeneCards: DSG3
Available structures
PDB	Ortholog search: PDBe RCSB
PDB	List of PDB id codes 5EQX

Gene location (Human)
Chr.	Chromosome 18 (human)
Band	18q12.1	Start	31,447,741 bp
Band	18q12.1	End	31,478,702 bp

Gene location (Mouse)
Chr.	Chromosome 18 (mouse)
Band	18 A2|18 11.39 cM	Start	20,643,331 bp
Band	18 A2|18 11.39 cM	End	20,680,516 bp
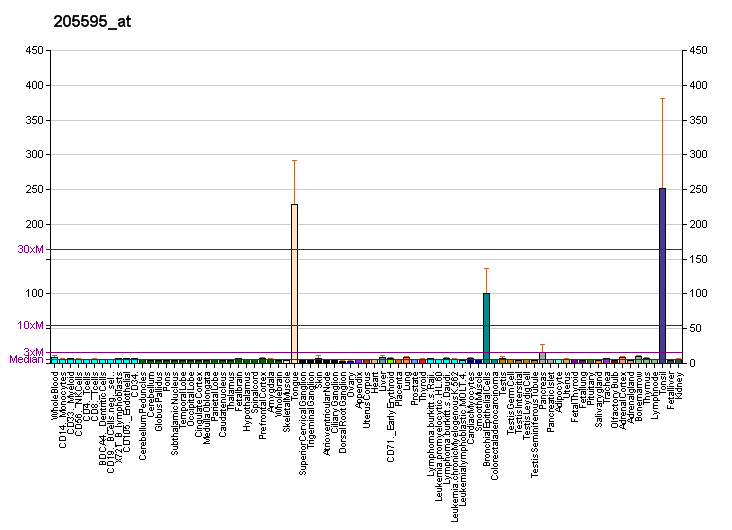
RNA expression pattern
Bgee	Human / Mouse (ortholog); Top expressed in: gums; gingival epithelium; mucosa of pharynx; oral cavity; body of tongue; human penis; vulva; cervix epithelium; skin of thigh; skin of abdomen / Top expressed in: esophagus; skin of external ear; conjunctival fornix; cornea; lip; skin of back; skin of abdomen; hair follicle; lumbar spinal ganglion; hand; More reference expression data
BioGPS	More reference expression data
Gene ontology
Molecular function	calcium ion binding; metal ion binding
Cellular component	integral component of membrane; cytosol; cell junction; desmosome; extracellular exosome; membrane; plasma membrane; cornified envelope; cell-cell junction
Biological process	cell adhesion; homophilic cell adhesion via plasma membrane adhesion molecules; keratinization; cornification; cell-cell adhesion
Sources:Amigo / QuickGO
Orthologs
Databases	NCBI: entry; OMA: entry
Species	Human	Mouse
Entrez	1830	13512
Ensembl	ENSG00000134757	ENSMUSG00000056632
UniProt	P32926	O35902
RefSeq (mRNA)	NM_001944	NM_030596
RefSeq (protein)	NP_001935	NP_085099
Location (UCSC)	Chr 18: 31.45 – 31.48 Mb	Chr 18: 20.64 – 20.68 Mb
PubMed search
- Wikidata
View/Edit Human	View/Edit Mouse

Desmoglein-3 is a protein that in humans is encoded by the DSG3 gene. In the skin epidermis Desmoglein-3 is expressed in the basal lower layers of the epidermis, and dominates in terms of expression on mucosal surfaces compared to Desmoglein-1.

== Function ==
Desmosomes are cell-cell junctions between epithelial, myocardial, and certain other cell types. Desmoglein 3 is a calcium-binding transmembrane glycoprotein component of desmosomes in vertebrate epithelial cells. Currently, four desmoglein subfamily members have been identified and all are members of the cadherin cell adhesion molecule superfamily. These desmoglein gene family members are located in a cluster on chromosome 18. This protein, along with Desmoglein-1, has been identified as the autoantigen of the autoimmune skin blistering disease pemphigus vulgaris. The mucosal dominant form of pemphigus vulgaris only involves antibodies against Desmoglein-3 and causes mucosal erosions, but no skin lesions. Desmoglein-3 serves as a prognostic marker of Esophageal Squamous Cell Carcinoma (ESCC), and may even be involved in the progression of ESCC.

== Pathogenicity ==
Pathogenicity of Desmoglein-3 antibodies comes from the existence of a tryptophan residue that could be interacting with the binding pocket that is necessary for trans-interaction of Desmoglein molecules. Such antibodies can lead to the cause of skin disorders like pemphigus vulgaris.

== Interactions ==
Desmoglein 3 has been shown to interact with PKP3.

== See also ==
- Desmoglein
- List of target antigens in pemphigus
- List of conditions caused by problems with junctional proteins
