= Acantholysis =

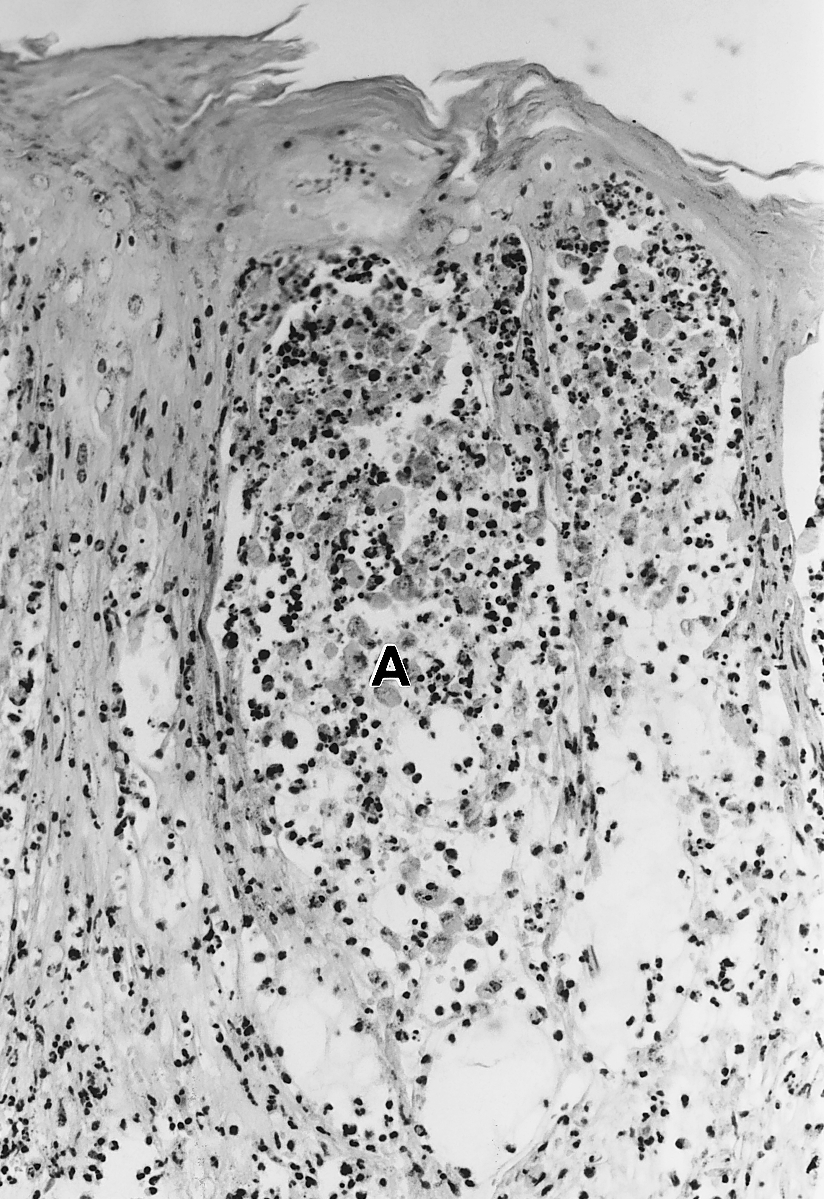
- Foot-and-mouth disease - acantholysis in a sample of a skin vesicle: Necrosis of the stratum spinosum can be observed, and keratinocytes floating in the vesicular fluid (spongiosa).
- Specialty: Dermatology

Acantholysis is the loss of intercellular connections, such as desmosomes, resulting in loss of cohesion between keratinocytes, seen in diseases such as pemphigus vulgaris, Grover’s disease, Hailey-Hailey Disease, and HHV infections particularly HSV and VZV. It is absent in bullous pemphigoid, making it useful for differential diagnosis. This disruption between cells causes intra-epidermal clefts, vesicles and bullae due to cells becoming rounded and no longer attached to one another.

Focusing on Pemphigus vulgaris, a blistering auto-immune disease, during acantholysis, circulating autoantibodies cause disruption of cell-cell and cell-matrix adhesion. The antibodies circulate against intercellular adhesion structures and demosomal protein desmoglein (DSG), which causes the disruption. Acantholytic cells also known as Tzanck cells are a distinguishing feature when diagnosing Pemphigus vulgaris. The Tzanck test can be used to diagnosis Pemphigus vulgaris for patients who are uncomfortable with a biopsy. he test can be used to identify acantholytic cells which are classified as large round keratinocytes characterized by an enlarged nucleus, indistinct or missing nucleoli and plentiful basophilic cytoplasm. This histological feature is also seen in herpes simplex infections (HSV 1 and 2) and varicella zoster infections (chicken pox and shingles).

== Epidemiology ==
The incidence of acantholysis varies according to the condition it is associated with.

In Pemphigus vulgaris, the incidence ranges from 0.076 to 5 per 100,000 person-years. The occurrence of Pemphigus vulgaris is most common in adults between ages of 50 and 60 years old. Approximately 70% of cases of this condition come from India, China, Malaysia and the Middle East. While Pemphigus vulgaris affects all, the highest incidence occurs in Ashkenazi Jews. Some common factors that cause this condition are stress, medication, surgical and dental procedures, physical trauma or other illnesses. Genetics is also a strong factor in inheriting Pemphigus vulgaris. This has been showed in Ashkenazi Jews with Pemphigus vulgaris.

Grover’s disease, which is also caused by acantholysis, is most common in older adults with older adults likely to have more extensive and longer duration of the disease. The disease is around 1.6 to 2.1 times more common in males than females. Some factors that are associated with causing Grover’s disease are environmental factors like extensive sunlight exposure or heat and preexisting illnesses such as cancer and infections.

== See also ==
- Skin lesion
- Skin disease
- List of cutaneous conditions
