= Pemphigus vulgaris =

Chronic blistering skin disease

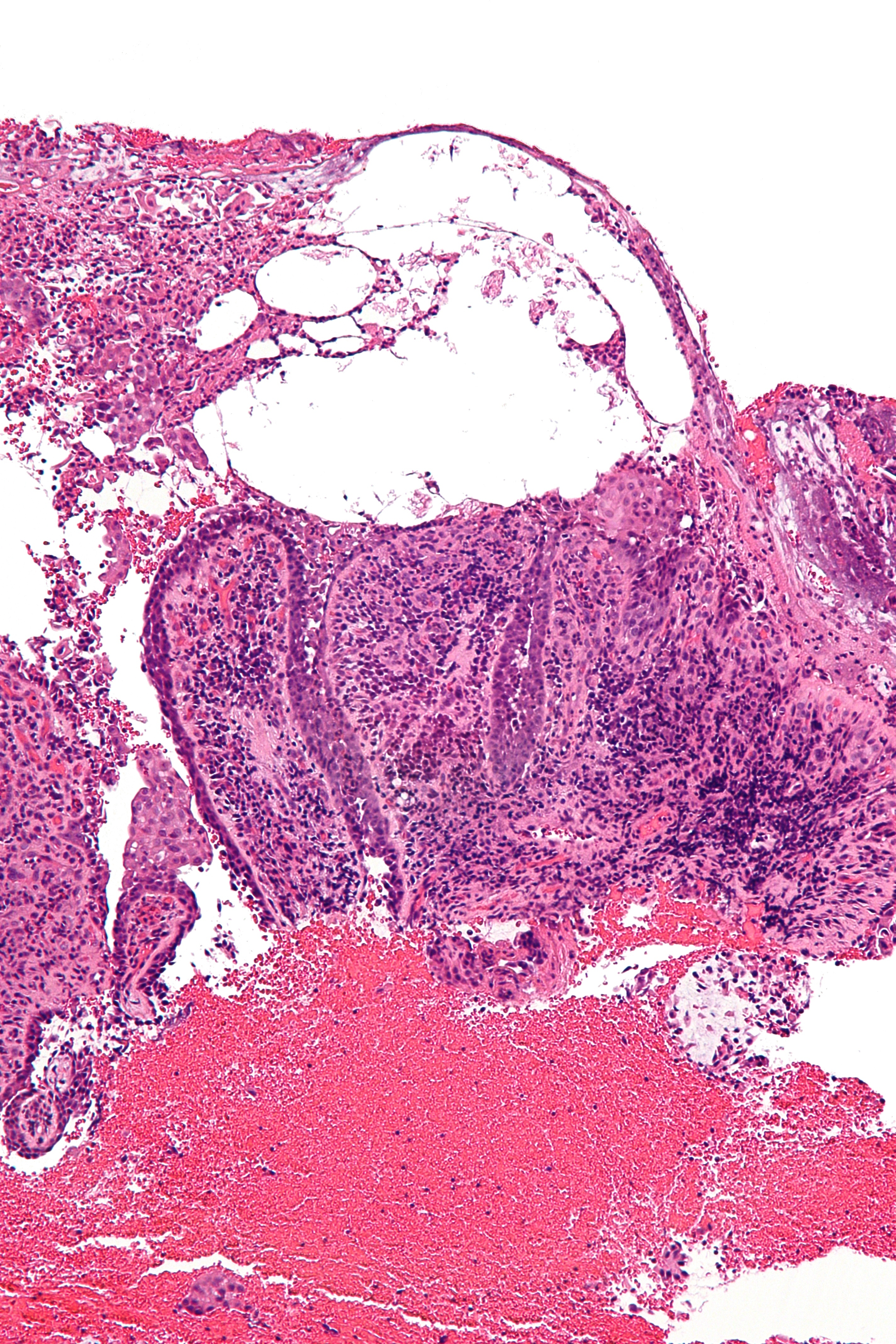
- Micrograph of pemphigus vulgaris with the characteristic "tombstoning". H&E stain.
- Specialty: Dermatology

Pemphigus vulgaris is a rare chronic blistering skin disease and the most common form of pemphigus. Pemphigus was derived from the Greek word pemphix, meaning blister. It is classified as a type II hypersensitivity reaction in which antibodies are formed against desmosomes, components of the skin that function to keep certain layers of skin bound to each other. As desmosomes are attacked, the layers of skin separate, and the clinical picture resembles a blister. These blisters are due to acantholysis, or the breaking apart of intercellular connections through an autoantibody-mediated response. Over time the condition inevitably progresses without treatment: lesions increase in size and distribution throughout the body, behaving physiologically like a severe burn.

Before the advent of modern treatments, mortality for the disease was close to 90%. Today, the mortality rate with treatment is in the range of 5–15%, after the introduction of corticosteroids as primary treatment. Nevertheless, in 1998, pemphigus vulgaris was the fourth most common cause of death due to a skin disorder. It is thus still deemed "potentially fatal".

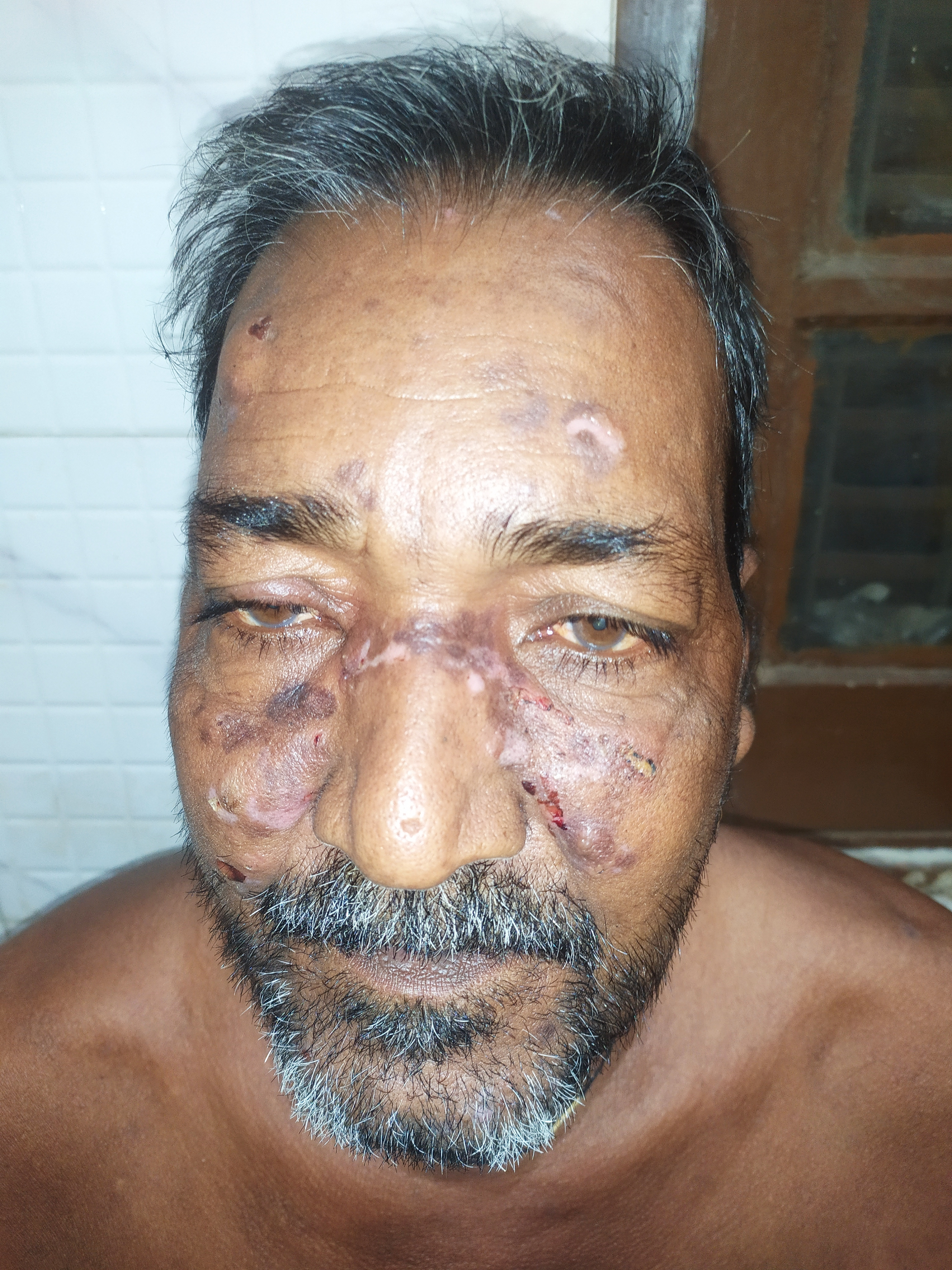
Pemphigus vulgaris on face

The disease mainly affects middle-aged and older adults between 50 and 60 years old. There has historically been a higher incidence in women.

== Signs and symptoms ==
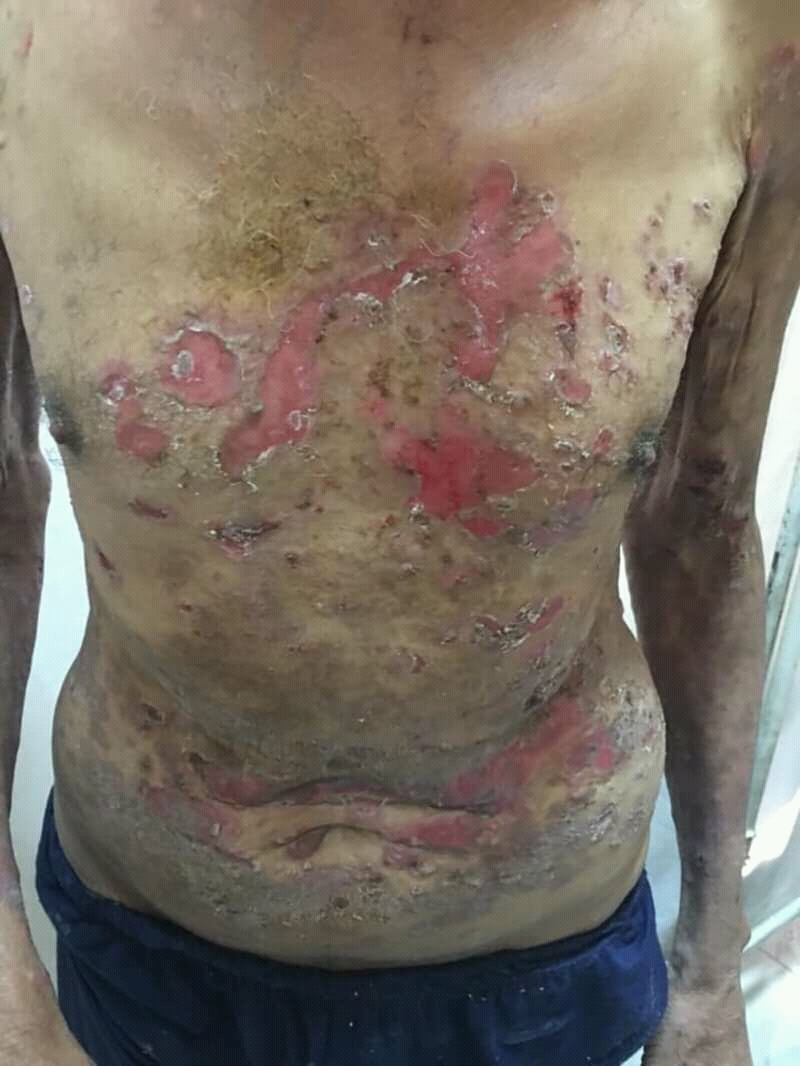
Pemphigus vulgaris

Pemphigus vulgaris most commonly presents with oral blisters (buccal and palatine mucosa, especially), but also includes cutaneous blisters. Other mucosal surfaces, the conjunctiva, nose, esophagus, penis, vulva, vagina, cervix, and anus, may also be affected. Flaccid blisters over the skin are frequently seen with sparing of the skin covering the palms and soles.

Blisters commonly erode and leave ulcerated lesions and erosions. A positive Nikolsky sign (induction of blistering in normal skin or at the edge of a blister) is indicative of the disease.

Severe pain with chewing can lead to weight loss and malnutrition.

== Pathophysiology ==
Pemphigus is an autoimmune disease caused by antibodies directed against both desmoglein 1 and desmoglein 3 present in desmosomes. Loss of desmosomes results in loss of cohesion between keratinocytes in the epidermis, and a disruption of the barrier function served by intact skin. The process is classified as a type II hypersensitivity reaction (in which antibodies bind to antigens on the body's own tissues). On histology, the basal keratinocytes are usually still attached to the basement membrane, leading to a characteristic appearance called "tombstoning". Transudative fluid accumulates in between the keratinocytes and the basal layer (suprabasal split), forming a blister that is easily dislodged when a lateral force is applied, resulting in what is known as a positive Nikolsky's sign. This is a contrasting feature from bullous pemphigoid, which is thought to be due to anti-hemidesmosome antibodies, and where the detachment occurs between the epidermis and dermis (subepidermal bullae). Clinically, pemphigus vulgaris is characterized by extensive flaccid blisters and mucocutaneous erosions. The severity of the disease, as well as the mucosal lesions, is believed to be directly proportional to the levels of desmoglein 3. Milder forms of pemphigus (like foliaceous and erythematoses) are more anti-desmoglein 1 heavy.

The disease arises most often in middle-aged or older people, usually starting with a blister that ruptures easily. It can also start with blisters in the mouth. The lesions can become quite extensive.

== Diagnosis ==
Because it is a rare disease, diagnosis is often complicated and takes a long time. Early in the disease, patients may have erosions in the mouth or blisters on the skin. These blisters can be itchy or painful. Theoretically, the blisters should demonstrate a positive Nikolsky's sign, in which the skin sloughs off from slight rubbing, but this is not always reliable. The gold standard for diagnosis is a punch biopsy from the area around the lesion that is examined by direct immunofluorescent staining, in which cells are acantholytic, that is, lacking the normal intercellular connections that hold them together. These can also be seen on a Tzanck smear. These cells are basically rounded, nucleated keratinocytes formed due to antibody-mediated damage to the cell adhesion protein desmoglein.

Pemphigus vulgaris is easily confused with impetigo and candidiasis. IgG4 is considered pathogenic. The diagnosis can be confirmed by testing for the infections that cause these other conditions, and by a lack of response to antibiotic treatment.

== Treatment ==
Corticosteroids and other immunosuppressive medications have historically been employed to reduce pemphigus symptoms, yet steroids are associated with serious and long-lasting side effects, and their use should be limited as much as possible. Intravenous immunoglobulin, mycophenolate mofetil, methotrexate, azathioprine, and cyclophosphamide have also been used with varying degrees of success.

An established alternative to steroids is monoclonal antibodies such as rituximab, which are increasingly being used as first-line treatment. In the summer of 2018, the FDA granted full approval to rituximab for this application, following a successful fast-track evaluation. In numerous case series, many patients achieve remission after one cycle of rituximab. Treatment is more successful if initiated early on in the course of the disease, perhaps even at diagnosis. Rituximab treatment combined with monthly IV immunoglobulin infusions has resulted in long-term remission with no recurrence of disease for 10 years after treatment was halted. This was a small trial study of 11 patients with 10 patients followed to completion.

Due to the successful use of rituximab, an anti-CD20 monoclonal treatment, in managing this disease, other anti-CD20 drugs such as ocrelizumab, veltuzumab, and ofatumumab have been explored as potential treatments.

Key companies in pemphigus vulgaris therapeutics include Principia Biopharma, Topas Therapeutics, and Argenx BVBA. Rituximab demonstrated superior efficacy compared to mycophenolate mofetil in a Phase III clinical trial, results of which were published in 2021.

== Epidemiology ==
Pemphigus vulgaris is a relatively rare disease that only affects about 1 to 5 people in 1 million in the United Kingdom, with an incidence of 1-10 cases per 1 million people globally. There is an estimated prevalence of 14,000+ cases in the United States and 42,400+ in the seven major markets (US, UK, Japan, Germany, France, Italy, Spain) which is five times as prevalent as Pemphigus foliaceous.

Cases of pemphigus vulgaris usually do not develop until after the age of 50 or so. The disease is not contagious, which means it cannot be spread from person to person. In 2012, Israeli researchers indicated they had identified a genetic cause for the disease, which they indicated as 40 times more likely to afflict Jews compared to other demographic groups.

The data pool is small for rare diseases. Some sources claim females are more affected by the disease, while others claim men and women are equally affected. The patient advocacy organisation NORD sees people of many different cultures and racial backgrounds similarly affected, but with a prevalence for Ashkenazi Jews, people of Mediterranean, North Indian, and Persian descent. There has been no found difference in the rate of disease when looking at socioeconomic factors as well. If left untreated, 8 of 10 people with the disease die within a year with a cause of death being infection or loss of fluids, which is very common for raw, open sores that are characteristic of pemphigus vulgaris. With treatment, only about 1 in 10 people with the disease die, either from the condition or side effects of the medicine.

An effect of the disease being so rare is that there is not enough evidence to prove that the treatments currently being used are actually as effective as they could be. Doctors are trying to find effective steroid-sparing agents to use in the treatment to decrease the side effects of long-term steroid treatment. The small number of case numbers makes it hard to test statistical significance between the affected and the control groups when testing if these types of systematic treatments are effective.

== Research ==
Research into using genetically modified T-cells to treat pemphigus vulgaris in mice was reported in 2016. Rituximab indiscriminately attacks all B cells, which reduces the body's ability to control infections. In the experimental treatment, human T cells are genetically engineered to recognize only those B cells that produce antibodies to desmoglein. In PV, autoreactive B cells produce antibodies against Dsg3, disrupting its adhesive function and causing skin blistering. By expressing Dsg3 on their surfaces, the CAAR-T cells lure those B cells in and kill them. The Dsg 3 CAAR-T cells eliminated Dsg3-specific B cells in lab dishes and in mice, the researchers reported at the time.

== See also ==
- List of conditions caused by problems with junctional proteins
- List of cutaneous conditions
- List of immunofluorescence findings for autoimmune bullous conditions
