= Desmoglein-1 =

Protein found in humans

DSG1

Identifiers
- Aliases: DSG1, CDHF4, DG1, DSG, EPKHE, EPKHIA, PPKS1, SPPK1, desmoglein 1
- External IDs: OMIM: 125670; MGI: 2664357; GeneCards: DSG1

Gene location (Human)
Chr.	Chromosome 18 (human)
Band	18q12.1	Start	31,318,160 bp
Band	18q12.1	End	31,359,246 bp

Gene location (Mouse)
Chr.	Chromosome 18 (mouse)
Band	18 A2|18 11.32 cM	Start	20,509,786 bp
Band	18 A2|18 11.32 cM	End	20,543,253 bp
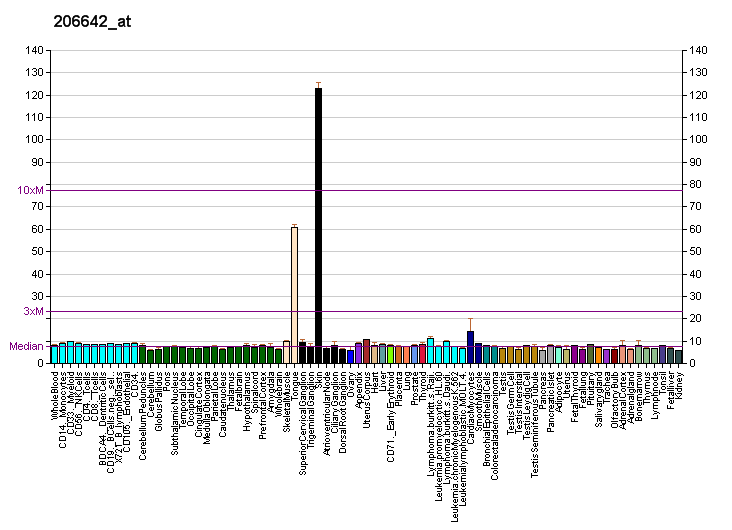
RNA expression pattern
Bgee	Human / Mouse (ortholog); Top expressed in: skin of arm; skin of thigh; skin of hip; vulva; nipple; human penis; skin of abdomen; hair follicle; gums; gingival epithelium / Top expressed in: esophagus; lip; zone of skin; spermatid; testicle; stomach; spermatocyte; right kidney; thymus; limb; More reference expression data
BioGPS	More reference expression data
Gene ontology
Molecular function	calcium ion binding; gamma-catenin binding; metal ion binding; protein binding; toxic substance binding
Cellular component	integral component of membrane; cytosol; lateral plasma membrane; membrane; cell-cell junction; plasma membrane; desmosome; cell junction; apical plasma membrane; cytoplasmic side of plasma membrane; cornified envelope; ficolin-1-rich granule membrane
Biological process	calcium-dependent cell-cell adhesion via plasma membrane cell adhesion molecules; maternal process involved in female pregnancy; response to progesterone; protein stabilization; cell adhesion; cell-cell junction assembly; homophilic cell adhesion via plasma membrane adhesion molecules; keratinization; neutrophil degranulation; cornification; cell-cell adhesion
Sources:Amigo / QuickGO
Orthologs
Databases	NCBI: entry; OMA: entry
Species	Human	Mouse
Entrez	1828	225256
Ensembl	ENSG00000134760	ENSMUSG00000061928
UniProt	Q02413	Q7TSF1
RefSeq (mRNA)	NM_001942	NM_181682
RefSeq (protein)	NP_001933	NP_859010
Location (UCSC)	Chr 18: 31.32 – 31.36 Mb	Chr 18: 20.51 – 20.54 Mb
PubMed search
- Wikidata
View/Edit Human	View/Edit Mouse

Desmoglein-1 is a protein that in humans is encoded by the DSG1 gene. Desmoglein-1 is expressed everywhere in the skin epidermis, but mainly it is expressed in the superficial upper layers of the skin epidermis.

== Function ==
Desmosomes are cell-cell junctions between epithelial, myocardial and certain other cell types. Desmoglein-1 is a calcium-binding transmembrane glycoprotein component of desmosomes in vertebrate epithelial cells. Currently, four desmoglein subfamily members have been identified and all are members of the cadherin cell adhesion molecule superfamily. These desmoglein gene family members are located in a cluster on chromosome 18. The protein encoded by this gene has been identified as the autoantigen of the autoimmune skin blistering disease pemphigus foliaceus. It has been found that desmoglein-1 is the target antigen in majority of the cases linked to IgG/IgA pemphigus, which is an autoimmune IgG/IgA antibody mediated response. Desmoglein-1 is also a target of Staphylococcus exotoxins (exfoliatins) A and B which contribute to the pathoaetiology of staphylococcal scalded skin syndrome (SSSS).

Deficiency of the desmoglein-1 protein has been found to be associated with increased expression of multiple genes encoding allergy-related cytokines. Desmoglein-1 is haploinsufficient and a mutation in the gene can cause the autosomal dominant mutation striate palmoplantar keratoderma. In 2013, cases have arisen where the homozygous loss of the desmoglein-1 gene has resulted in a rare syndrome known as SAM syndrome – severe dermatitis, multiple allergies, and metabolic wasting.

== Interactions ==
Desmoglein-1 has been shown to interact with PKP3, PKP2, and PTPRT (PTPrho)

== See also ==
- Desmoglein
- List of target antigens in pemphigus
- List of conditions caused by problems with junctional proteins
