= Linear IgA bullous dermatosis =

- Other names: Linear IgA dermatosis
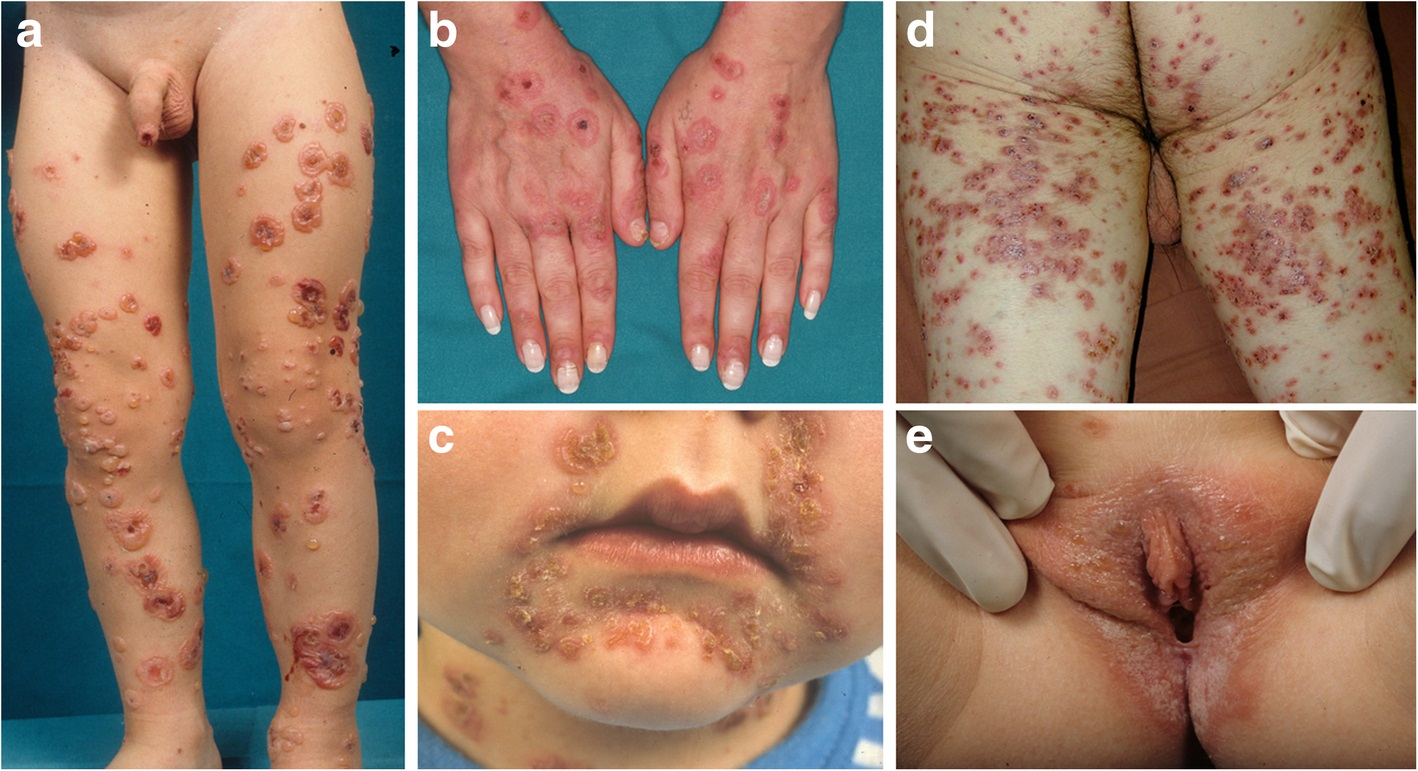
- (a) Widespread vesiculobullous eruption on the lower limbs with elements in a "string of pearls" arrangement; (b) targetoid vesicular lesions on erythematous skin involving the dorsa of the hands; (c) blisters with a "string of pearls" configuration and crusts in the perioral area; (d) erythematous, vesicular lesions partially eroded on the posterior aspects of both thighs; (e) vesicles involving the vulvar area in a child.
- Specialty: Immunology, dermatology

Linear IgA bullous dermatosis is a rare immune-mediated blistering skin disease frequently associated with medication exposure, especially vancomycin, with men and women being equally affected. It was first described by Tadeusz Chorzelski in 1979 and may be divided into two types:

Adult linear IgA disease is an acquired, autoimmune blistering disease that may present with a clinical pattern of vesicles indistinguishable from dermatitis herpetiformis, or with vesicles and bullae in a bullous pemphigoid-like appearance. This disease can often be difficult to treat even with usually effective medications such as rituximab.

Childhood linear IgA disease (also known as "Chronic bullous disease of childhood") is an acquired, self-limited bullous disease that may begin by the time the patient is age 2 to 3 and usually remits by age 13.

== Signs and symptoms ==
Lesions on the skin, mucous membranes, or both may be seen in cases with linear IgA bullous dermatosis (LABD). While LABD can affect both adults and children, there are variations in the disease's clinical features between these two groups of people.

The most common symptom of LABD of childhood, also called chronic bullous disease of childhood, is the sudden growth of vesicles or bullae on areas of skin that are either inflammatory or not. An arciform or annular appearance is frequently the consequence of new blisters forming at the margins of lesions that are healing. These lesions are often described as looking like rosettes, crowns of jewels, or strings of pearls. Skin lesions typically occur in a wide range of locations, including the hands, feet, genitalia, trunk, and face, especially the perioral area. The lower abdomen, inner thighs, and perineum are frequently the most severely affected areas. Children who are affected may show no symptoms, yet pruritus is frequent and can get quite bad. For certain people, severe itching signals the beginning of the illness again.

Adult patients with LABD usually have a sudden onset of skin lesions; however, the condition can develop more slowly. Bullae and tight vesicles can form inside inflammatory plaques or on healthy skin. Adults experience a lower incidence of developing annular lesions exhibiting peripheral vesiculation compared to children. Lesion formation is prevalent in the trunk, extensor extremities, buttocks, and face (especially the perioral area). There have also been reports of localized variations of LABD that manifest as annular inflammatory plaques or restricted blistering eruptions. Strong pruritus may cause excoriated papules or lesions resembling prurigo nodularis to appear.

Both adults and children can experience mucous membrane involvement. Up to 80% of adult patients experience mucosal illness. Mucosal lesions usually manifest as erosions or ulcers; complete vesicles or bullae are not frequently found. Any mucosal surface, such as those in the mouth, conjunctiva, nose, genitalia, pharynx, larynx, anus, and esophagus, could be impacted. The mucosal areas most frequently affected are the oral and ocular mucosa. Lesions on the palate, palatine arches, or buccal mucosa are commonly seen in patients with oral diseases. Additionally, erosive cheilitis and gingivitis might be signs of oral LABD. Conjunctival redness, ocular discharge, ocular pain, or a feeling of a foreign body can all be symptoms of ocular illness.

== Causes ==
Circulating IgA anti-basement membrane zone antibodies directed against the 97 kDa component of BPAG2 (bullous pemphigoid antigen 2) in the lamina lucida are the primary cause of linear IgA bullous dermatosis (LABD).

=== Risk factors ===
The most frequent benign condition linked to LABD is ulcerative colitis. It is unknown why there is a correlation between ulcerative colitis and LABD. According to some writers, aberrant IgA1 production by the inflamed colon may have a role in the emergence of LABD.

Many case reports have documented the incidence of LABD in conjunction with solid organ cancers and lymphoproliferative diseases.

Psoriasis, systemic lupus erythematosus, and a number of infections have also been linked to LABD in a small number of patients. There have also been reports of LABD developing after UV radiation exposure.

=== Triggers ===
Drug exposure has been shown in several case reports to be a contributing factor. The pharmacologic medication most commonly mentioned as a possible initiating cause is vancomycin. A number of antibiotics, nonsteroidal anti-inflammatory medications, lithium, amiodarone, captopril, cyclosporine, phenytoin, interferon alfa, furosemide, and somatostatin are a few other medications that may be connected to LABD.

=== Genetics ===
Development of LABD may also be influenced by genetic factors. There have been reports of associations between LABD and the tumor necrosis factor-2 allele, human leukocyte antigen (HLA) B8, HLA Cw7, HLA DR3, and HLA DQ2.

== Mechanism ==
While it is acknowledged that one of the hallmarks of linear IgA bullous dermatosis (LABD) is the presence of IgA antibodies linked to the basement membrane zone, the process by which lesions occur in this condition is not well known. The pathophysiology of this disease may involve both cellular and humoral immune responses. Specifically, the formation of cutaneous and mucosal lesions may be facilitated by tissue damage brought on by an antibody-induced local inflammatory response as well as the release of proteolytic enzymes by neutrophils along with other inflammatory cells.

The majority of LABD patients exhibit IgA1 antibodies that are specific to the basement membrane zone's 97 kDa and 120 kDa antigens. Bullous pemphigoid antigen 2 (BP180/type XVII collagen), a transmembrane protein essential for epidermal-dermal adhesion, is broken down into pieces in both of these antigens. Less commonly, the NC16a epitope on BP180 has been linked to LABD. IgA antibodies directed against various basement membrane antigens, such as type VII collagen (COL7), laminin-332, or laminin gamma 1, are present in certain patients with LABD. The target antigen in certain people with vancomycin-induced LABD appears to be type VII collagen.

== Diagnosis ==
The clinical manifestations of various mucocutaneous disorders may be confused with those of linear IgA bullous dermatosis (LABD). Therefore, laboratory studies are usually used to confirm the diagnosis when available. The gold standard for diagnosing LABD is the detection of linear IgA deposits along the basement membrane zone using direct immunofluorescence (DIF), even though the results of a regular histopathologic examination of the affected tissue may suggest LABD.

Linear IgA bullous dermatosis histopathologic features are vague and frequently mimic dermatitis herpetiformis. Characteristic is a subepidermal blister with an underlying dermal infiltration that is primarily composed of neutrophils. There may also be papillary microabscesses, eosinophils, and lymphocytes that resemble those found in dermatitis herpetiformis.

== Treatment ==
First-line treatment for LABD is thought to be dapsone, an immunomodulatory sulfone that has been successfully used to treat a variety of dermatologic illnesses marked by neutrophilic infiltrates. Treatment with sulfapyridine or sulfamethoxypyridazine, sulfonamide drugs with chemical similarities to dapsone, may be beneficial for patients who cannot tolerate dapsone.

== Gallery ==
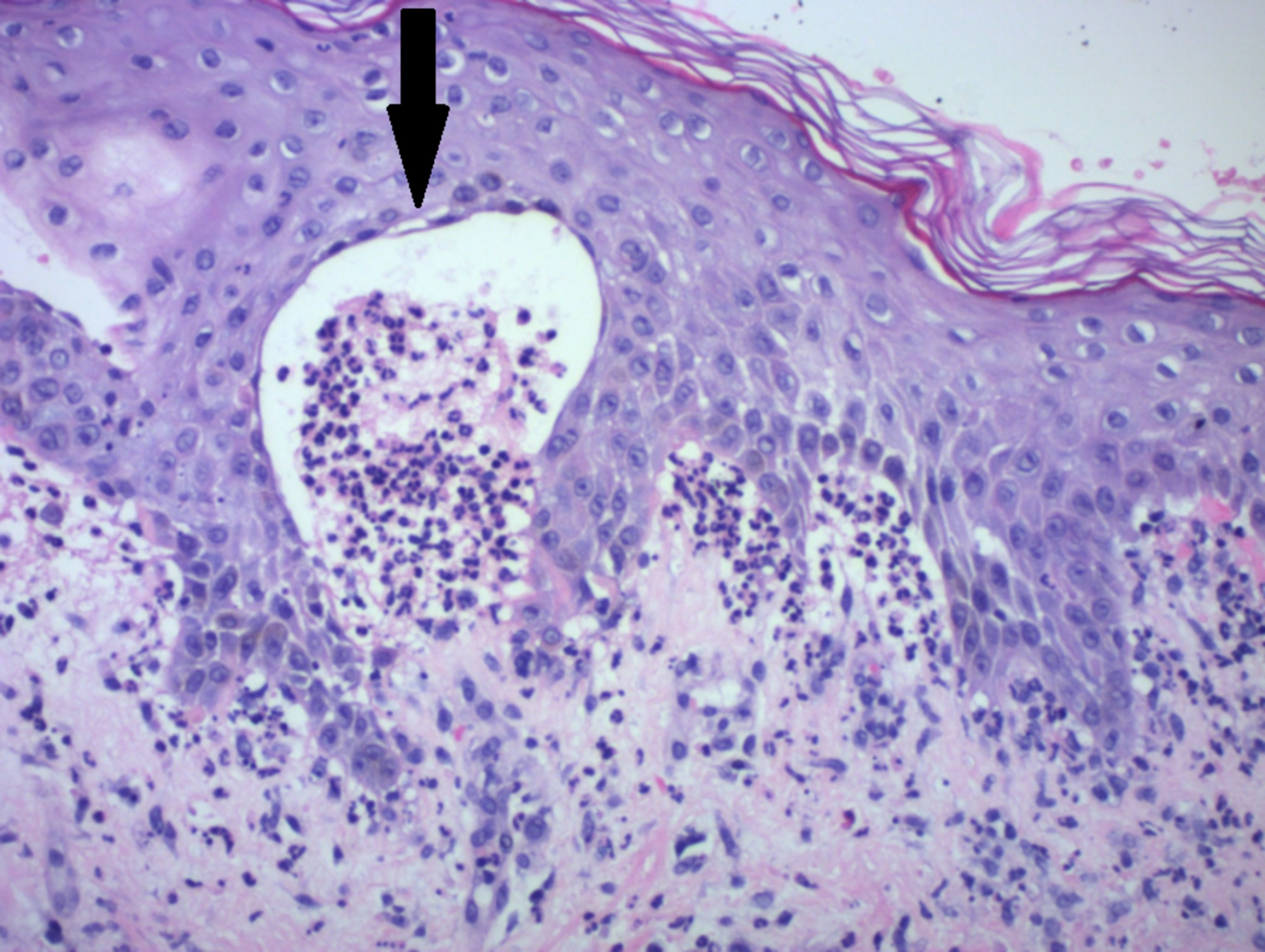
Micrograph: Subepidermal blister formation and neutrophils

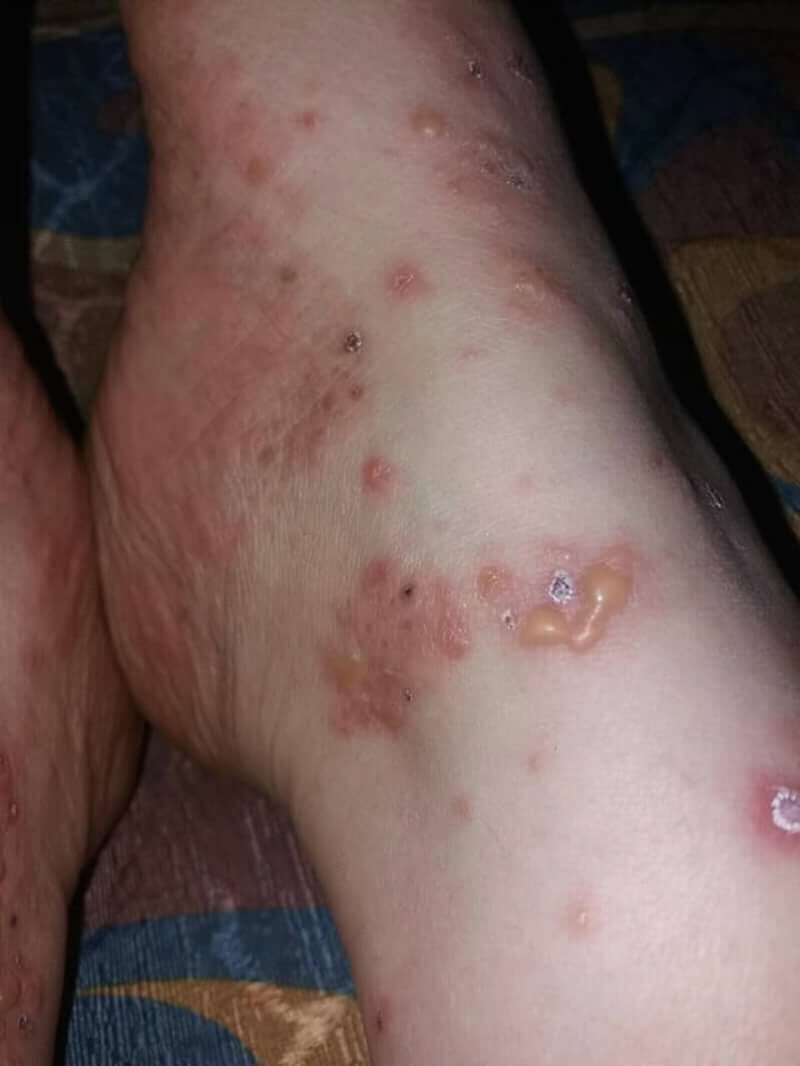

== See also ==
- List of target antigens in pemphigoid
- List of immunofluorescence findings for autoimmune bullous conditions
