= Dühring =

Dühring and Duhring may refer to:

- Eugen Dühring (1833–1921), German philosopher and economist
- H. Louis Duhring Jr. (1874–1953), American architect
- Louis Adolphus Duhring (1845–1913), American physician and professor
- Uwe Dühring (born 1955), German rower
- Duhring, West Virginia, U.S., an unincorporated community
