= Pemphigoid nodularis =

Cutaneous condition

- Specialty: Dermatology

Pemphigoid nodularis is a cutaneous condition that is a variant of bullous pemphigoid that has skin lesions mimicking prurigo nodularis.

The antibody involved is IgG.

== See also ==
- Adult linear IgA disease
- List of cutaneous conditions
