= IgA specific serine endopeptidase =

Enzyme that cleaves IgA antibodies at certain regions

IgA-specific serine endopeptidase

Identifiers
- EC no.: 3.4.21.72
- CAS no.: 55127-02-1

Databases
- BRENDA: enzyme data
- ExPASy: NiceZyme view
- KEGG: enzyme entry
- MetaCyc: metabolic pathway
- Rhea: reactions
- PDB structures: RCSB PDB PDBe PDBsum
Search
- PMC: articles
- PubMed: articles
- NCBI: proteins

IgA protease (EC 3.4.21.72, IgA-specific serine endopeptidase, IgA proteinase, IgA-specific proteinase, immunoglobulin A protease, immunoglobulin A proteinase) is an enzyme. This enzyme catalyses the following chemical reaction^{[}^{reaction equation needed]}

It performs cleavage of human immunoglobulin A subclass 1 (IgA1) molecules in the heavy chain hinge region but does not cleave IgA2. No small molecule substrates are known.

This enzyme is secreted by Gram-negative bacteria Neisseria gonorrhoeae, Neisseria meningitidis, Haemophilus influenzae, and Gram-positive Streptococcus pneumoniae.

The action of IgA protease allows the above mentioned bacteria to adhere to mucous membranes.

An IgA protease is a highly specific 106kDa enzyme that cleaves amino acid sequences of certain proteins. The natural substrate of IgA proteases is immunoglobulin A, hence its name. The enzyme is in fact capable of cleavage of proteins with the amino acid sequence Cleaves N-X-Z-Pro-Pro/-Y-Pro-C, where the X in the sequence preferably is a Proline or Serine; the Y = Threonine, Serine or Alanine; and Z preferably is Arginine or Threonine. Because of the sequence that the enzyme is able to cleave, it is also called IgAse Pro-Pro-Y-Pro. Thus, the IgA protease act by cleaving the proline-rich hinge region of the heavy chain of IgA1. Three major bacteria, Neisseria meningitidis, Streptococcus pneumoniae, and Haemophilus influenzae type B, release the IgA protease which destroys IgA.

== See also ==
- Immunoglobulin A
