= Secretory component =

Schematic of immunoglobulin A dimer showing H-chain (blue), L-chain (red), J-chain (magenta) and secretory component (yellow).

The secretory component is a component of polymeric immunoglobulin secreted by mucous membranes. It is a proteolytic cleavage product of the polymeric immunoglobulin receptor which remains associated with dimeric IgA and pentameric IgM in sero-mucus secretions.

Polymeric Ig (pIg) is secreted by mucous membranes via transcytosis. pIg binds to the polymeric immunoglobulin receptor on the basolateral surface of epithelial cells and is taken up into the cell. The receptor-pIg complex passes through the cellular compartments before being secreted on the luminal surface of the epithelial cells, still attached to the receptor. Proteolysis of the receptor occurs and the dimeric pIg molecule, along with the secretory component, are free to diffuse throughout the lumen.

Secretory components wrap around two IgA units joined by a J chain protein fragment, resulting in a >--< configuration, with each of the two antigen binding regions of the two constituent y-shaped antibodies exposed. One identified function of secretory components is to protect IgA antibodies from degradation by the gastric acids and enzymes of the digestive system. This property is especially important in the transfer of immune system components during breastfeeding.
