= FCAR =

Mammalian protein found in Homo sapiens

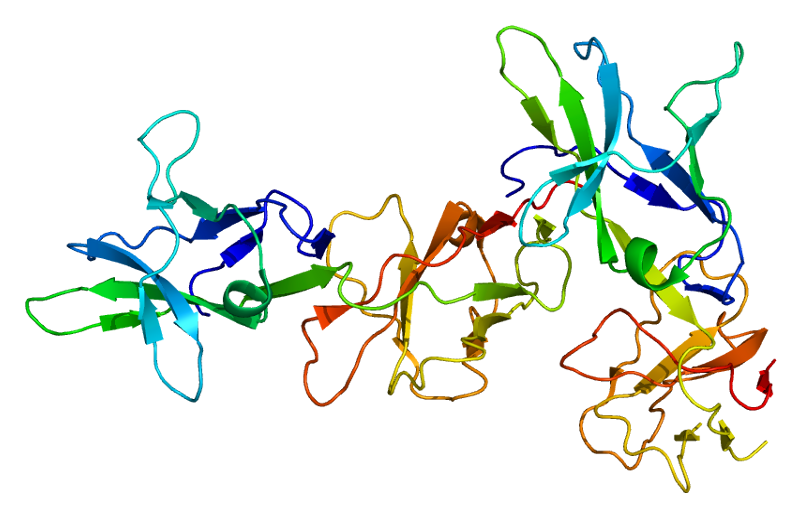
- Extracellular portion of FCAR

Identifiers
- Aliases: FCAR, CD89, CTB-61M7.2, FcalphaRI, Fc fragment of IgA receptor, Fc alpha receptor, FcalphaR
- External IDs: OMIM: 147045; GeneCards: FCAR
Available structures
PDB	Human UniProt search: PDBe RCSB
PDB	List of PDB id codes 1OVZ, 1OW0, 1UCT

Gene location (Human)
Chr.	Chromosome 19 (human)
Band	19q13.42	Start	54,874,235 bp
Band	19q13.42	End	54,891,420 bp
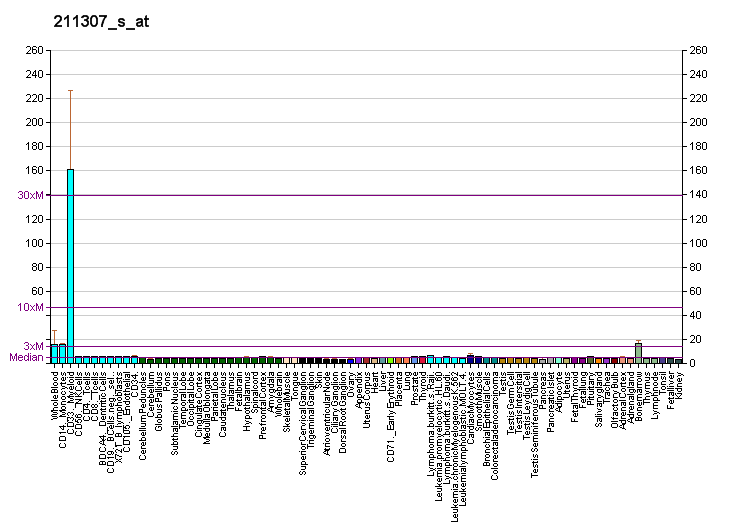

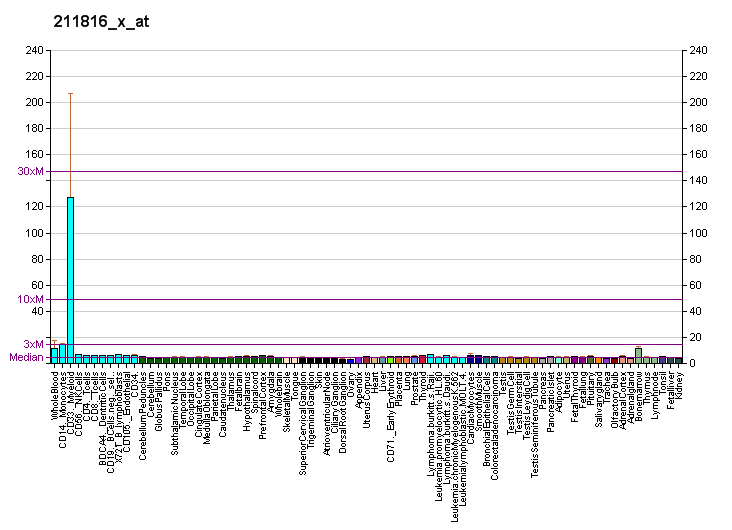
RNA expression pattern
Bgee	Human / Mouse (ortholog); Top expressed in: monocyte; bone marrow; bone marrow cell; blood; right lung; granulocyte; spleen; appendix; upper lobe of left lung; left uterine tube / n/a; More reference expression data
BioGPS	More reference expression data
Gene ontology
Molecular function	IgA receptor activity; IgA binding
Cellular component	integral component of membrane; extracellular region; plasma membrane; integral component of plasma membrane; membrane; specific granule membrane; tertiary granule membrane; ficolin-1-rich granule membrane
Biological process	immune response; neutrophil degranulation; neutrophil mediated immunity; positive regulation of neutrophil apoptotic process; cellular response to interferon-alpha; Fc receptor signaling pathway; neutrophil activation; cellular response to lipopolysaccharide; cellular response to interferon-gamma; cellular response to interleukin-6; cellular response to tumor necrosis factor; cellular response to granulocyte macrophage colony-stimulating factor stimulus; positive regulation of oxidative stress-induced cell death
Sources:Amigo / QuickGO
Orthologs
Databases	NCBI: entry; OMA: entry
Species	Human	Mouse
Entrez	2204	n/a
Ensembl	ENSG00000275564; ENSG00000284004; ENSG00000273738; ENSG00000283953; ENSG00000276985 ENSG00000275970; ENSG00000284061; ENSG00000283750; ENSG00000278415; ENSG00000186431; ENSG00000275136; ENSG00000276858; ENSG00000284245; ENSG00000275269; ENSG00000274580	n/a
UniProt	P24071	n/a
RefSeq (mRNA)	NM_002000; NM_133269; NM_133271; NM_133272; NM_133273 NM_133274; NM_133277; NM_133278; NM_133279; NM_133280	n/a
RefSeq (protein)	NP_001991; NP_579803; NP_579805; NP_579806; NP_579807 NP_579808; NP_579811; NP_579812	n/a
Location (UCSC)	Chr 19: 54.87 – 54.89 Mb	n/a
PubMed search		n/a
- Wikidata
View/Edit Human

Fc fragment of IgA receptor (FCAR) is a human gene that codes for the transmembrane receptor FcαRI, also known as CD89 (Cluster of Differentiation 89). FcαRI binds the heavy-chain constant region of Immunoglobulin A (IgA) antibodies. FcαRI is present on the cell surface of myeloid lineage cells, including neutrophils, monocytes, macrophages, and eosinophils, though it is notably absent from intestinal macrophages and does not appear on mast cells. FcαRI plays a role in both pro- and anti-inflammatory responses depending on the state of IgA bound. Inside-out signaling primes FcαRI in order for it to bind its ligand, while outside-in signaling caused by ligand binding depends on FcαRI association with the Fc receptor gamma chain (FcR γ-chain).

Though FcαRI is part of the Fc receptor immunoglobulin superfamily, the protein's primary structure is similar to receptors in the leukocyte receptor cluster (LRC), and the FCAR gene appears amidst LRC genes on chromosome 19. This contrasts with the location of other members of the Fc receptor immunoglobulin superfamily, which are encoded on chromosome 1. Additionally, though there are equivalents to FCAR in several species, there is no such homolog in mice.

== Structure ==
The FcαRI α-chain consists of two extracellular domains, EC1 and EC2, at a right angle to each other, a transmembrane domain, and an intracellular domain. However, this chain alone cannot perform signaling in response to IgA binding, and FcαRI must associate with a dimeric form of FcR g-chain, the ends of which contain immunoreceptor tyrosine-based activation motifs (ITAMs). The FcR γ-chain is responsible for relaying the signal to the inside of the cell.

Two FCAR alleles differing by a single nucleotide polymorphism (SNP) code for two FcαRI molecules that differ in their ability to signal for IL-6 and TNF-α production and release. The SNP results in either serine or glycine as the 248th residue of the amino acid sequence, a position in the intracellular domain of FcαRI. Compared to FcαRI with Ser248, FcαRI molecules with Gly248 are better able to signal for the release of IL-6, even independently from FcR γ-chain association.

Alternative splicing of the transcript from this gene produces ten mRNA variants encoding different isoforms.

== Inside-Out Signaling ==
FcαRI must first be primed by a process called inside-out signaling in order to bind with increased ability to IgA. Priming occurs when cytokines signaling the presence of an infection bind their receptors on FcαRI-expressing cells, activating the kinase PI3K. PI3K then activates p38 and PKC, which together with PP2A lead to the dephosphorylation of the Serine 263 residue (Ser263) on the intracellular domain of the FcαRI α-chain. The priming of FcαRI to be able to bind IgA does not depend on FcαRI association with the FcR γ-chain, but does depend on cytoskeleton organization.

Once primed, FcαRI can bind IgA. The FcαRI EC1 domain binds the hinge between the IgA-Fc regions Ca2 and Ca3 regions.

== Function ==
Signaling and the resulting cellular response caused by FcαRI binding IgA varies depending on the state of the IgA molecules. A pro-inflammatory response is signaled when IgA molecules in an immune complex bind to multiple FcαRI, resulting in the activation of Src family kinases and the phosphorylation of the FcR γ-chain ITAMs by Lyn. Syk, a tyrosine kinase, subsequently docks at the phosphorylated ITAMs and initiates PI3K and PLC-γ signaling. The ensuing signaling cascades lead to pro-inflammatory responses such as release of cytokines, phagocytosis, respiratory bursts, antibody-dependent cell-mediated cytotoxicity, production of reactive oxygen species, and antigen presentation.

Despite signaling via ITAMs, which typically initiate activation cascades, FcαRI may either act as an activating or inhibitory receptor. Inhibitory ITAM signaling (ITAMi) results in anti-inflammatory responses. When FcαRI monovalently binds monomeric, non-antigen bound IgA, the form most common in serum, the resulting signals result in inactivation of other activating receptors such as FcγR and FcεRI. The binding of the monomeric serum IgA causes Lyn to only partly phosphorylate the FcR γ-chain ITAMs. Consequently, Src homology region 2 domain-containing phosphatase-1 (SHP-1) is recruited by Syk to the FcR γ-chain. A tyrosine phosphatase, SHP-1 coordinates the anti-inflammatory response, preventing other receptors from signaling for pro-inflammatory responses by not allowing these receptors to become phosphorylated. This ITAMi signaling supports homeostasis in the absence of pathogens.

The anti-inflammatory role of monomeric IgA-FcαRI binding may have implications for treatment of allergic asthma, as shown by targeting FcαRI in transgenic mice models with anti-FcαRI Fab antibodies, which mimic the binding of monomeric IgA. This FcαRI targeting led to decreased infiltration of airway tissue by inflammatory leukocytes.

The secreted form of IgA (sIgA), a homodimer secreted across epithelial linings such as the gut epithelium, is sterically hindered in its binding to FcαRI. This is because some of sIgA's FcαRI binding site is obscured by a section of the cleaved polymeric Ig receptor that aided sIgA's secretion into the gut lumen. However, the precursor to sIgA, dimeric IgA (dIgA), binds to FcαRI with approximately the same affinity as monomeric IgA. Secreted IgA plays an important role in preventing immune response to commensal gut microbes, and accordingly intestinal macrophages do not express FcαRI. However, during invasion of mucosal tissue by pathogenic bacteria, neutrophils responding to the infection will bind and phagocytose dIgA-opsonized bacteria via FcαRI.

FcαRI is also an important Fc receptor for neutrophil killing of tumor cells. When FcαRI-expressing neutrophils come into contact with IgA-opsonized tumor cells, the neutrophils not only perform antibody-dependent cell-mediated cytotoxicity, but also release the cytokines TNF-α and IL-1β which cause increased neutrophil migration to the site.

== Interactions ==
FCAR has been shown to interact with FCGR1A.

== See also ==
- Cluster of differentiation
