= J chain =

Protein-coding gene in the species Homo sapiens

JCHAIN

Identifiers
- Aliases: JCHAIN, IGCJ, JCH, IGJ, J chain, joining chain of multimeric IgA and IgM
- External IDs: OMIM: 147790; MGI: 96493; GeneCards: JCHAIN

Gene location (Human)
Chr.	Chromosome 4 (human)
Band	4q13.3	Start	70,655,541 bp
Band	4q13.3	End	70,681,817 bp

Gene location (Mouse)
Chr.	Chromosome 5 (mouse)
Band	5|5 E1	Start	88,667,668 bp
Band	5|5 E1	End	88,675,750 bp
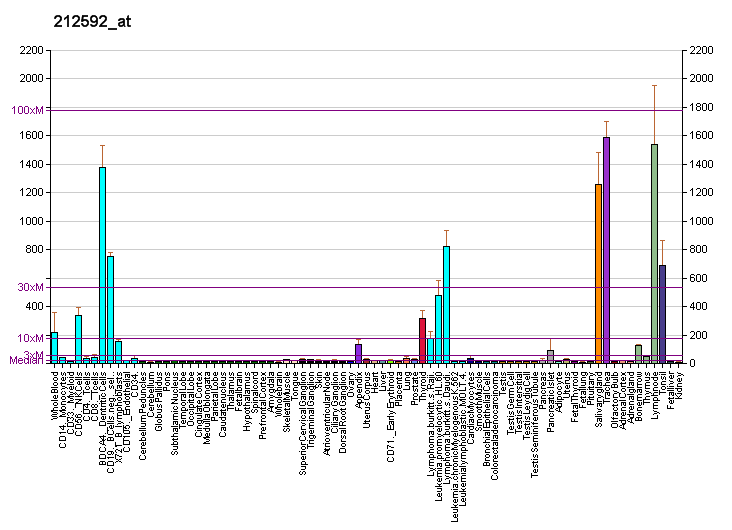
RNA expression pattern
Bgee	Human / Mouse (ortholog); Top expressed in: rectum; jejunal mucosa; mucosa of sigmoid colon; pylorus; cecum; mucosa of transverse colon; appendix; epithelium of nasopharynx; duodenum; trachea / Top expressed in: submandibular gland; spleen; duodenum; jejunum; Paneth cell; lymph node; tibiofemoral joint; tunica adventitia of aorta; mesenteric lymph nodes; thymus; More reference expression data
BioGPS	More reference expression data
Gene ontology
Molecular function	antigen binding; protein homodimerization activity; phosphatidylcholine binding; immunoglobulin receptor binding; single-stranded DNA binding; peptidoglycan binding; IgA binding; protein-macromolecule adaptor activity
Cellular component	secretory IgA immunoglobulin complex; blood microparticle; hexameric IgM immunoglobulin complex; monomeric IgA immunoglobulin complex; dimeric IgA immunoglobulin complex; pentameric IgM immunoglobulin complex; secretory dimeric IgA immunoglobulin complex; extracellular exosome; extracellular region; extracellular space
Biological process	adaptive immune response; retina homeostasis; glomerular filtration; immune response; innate immune response; positive regulation of respiratory burst; receptor-mediated endocytosis; positive regulation of protein oligomerization; leukocyte migration
Sources:Amigo / QuickGO
Orthologs
Databases	NCBI: entry; OMA: entry
Species	Human	Mouse
Entrez	3512	16069
Ensembl	ENSG00000132465	ENSMUSG00000067149
UniProt	P01591	P01592
RefSeq (mRNA)	NM_144646	NM_152839
RefSeq (protein)	NP_653247	NP_690052
Location (UCSC)	Chr 4: 70.66 – 70.68 Mb	Chr 5: 88.67 – 88.68 Mb
PubMed search
- Wikidata
View/Edit Human	View/Edit Mouse

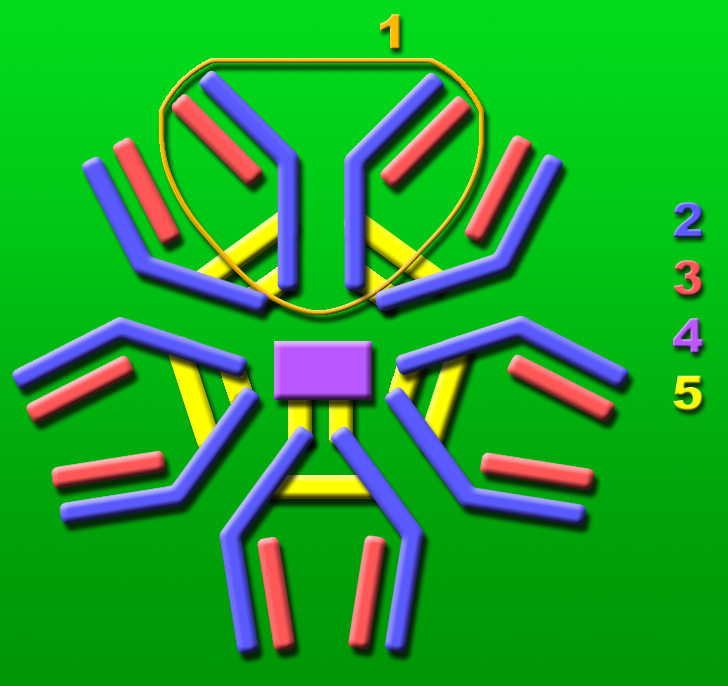
Immunoglobulin M (IgM) pentameric antibody molecule (consisting of five base units). 1: Base unit. 2: Heavy chains. 3: Light chains. 4: J chain. 5: Intermolecular disulfide bonds.

Schematic of immunoglobulin A dimer showing H-chain (blue), L-chain (red), J-chain (magenta) and secretory component (yellow).

The Joining (J) chain is a protein component that links monomers of antibodies IgM and IgA to form polymeric antibodies capable of secretion. The J chain is well conserved in the jawed vertebrates, but its specific functions are yet to be fully understood. It is a 137 residue polypeptide, encoded by the IGJ gene.

== Structure ==
The J chain is a glycoprotein. The preprotein has a 22-residue signal peptide that proceeds the actually secreted J chain (137 residues). The unglycosylated molecular weight of the secreted J chain is 15 kDa. The glycosylated molecular weight is 16.42 kDa (7.5% carbohydrate by weight).

The J chain's primary structure is unusually acidic having a high content of negatively charged amino acids. It has eight cysteine residues, six of which are involved in intramolecular disulfide bonds while the remaining two function to bind the Fc tailpiece regions of IgA or IgM antibodies, the α chain and μ chain respectively. An N-linked carbohydrate resulting from N-glycosylation is also essential in the protein's incorporation to antibody polymers.

The structures of the J chain in dimeric IgA and pentameric IgM have been experimentally determined via cryo-electron microscopy. The J chain proper has an N-terminal wing (NTW) consisting of 4 beta sheets and a short alpha helix and a C-terminal "hairpin" wing (CTW) consisting of a pair of long beta sheets. The NTW sheets "cap" the Fc tailpiece by lining up with the beta sheets of its last Ig-like domains and forming intermolecular disulfide bonds. The NTW loops and the CTW both reach into the space of the precious Fc domains. The CTW also binds PIGR.

== Function ==
=== Antibody polymerization ===
The J chain regulates the multimerization of IgM and IgA in mammals. When expressed in cells, it favors the formation of a pentameric IgM and an IgA dimer. IgM pentamers are most commonly found with a single J chain, but some studies have seen as many as 4 J chains associated to a single IgM pentamer.

The J chain is incorporated late in the formation of IgM polymers and thermodynamically favors the formation of pentamers as opposed to hexamers. In J chain-knockout (KO) mice, the hexameric IgM polymer dominates. These J chain negative IgM hexamers are 15-20 times more effective at activating complement than J chain positive IgM pentamers. However, J chain-KO mice have been shown have low concentrations of hexameric IgM and a deficiency in complement activation, suggesting additional in vivo regulatory mechanisms. Another consequence of pentameric IgM reduced complement activation is its allowance of J chain positive pIgM to bind antigen without causing excessive damage to epithelial membranes through complement activation.

The J chain facilitates IgA dimerization by linking two monomer secretory tails. Structurally, the J chain joins two antibody monomers asymmetrically by forming intermolecular disulfide bonds and bringing hydrophobic β-sandwiches on each molecule together. This multimerization mechanism involves chaperone proteins including binding immunoglobulin protein (BiP) and MZB1 each sequentially recruiting distinct factors of the polymerized antibody.

=== Antibody secretion ===
Mucosal membrane antibody secretion from the basal membrane to apical epithelial cells is facilitated by the polymeric Ig receptor (pIgR). A basal protein of the pIgR known as secretory component (SC) recognizes Ig ready for secretion. The binding between the secretory component and secretory Ig is facilitated by the antibody's J chain which makes physical contact with the secretory component in order to change the transporter's conformation to an open state. The complex is then transcytosed and the secretory component proteolytically cleaved from the receptor releasing the antibody to the apical side of the epithelial cell and to the lumen at large. This mechanism is thought to be largely conserved between the secretion of IgM and IgA.

== Regulation ==
J chain was originally believed to only be expressed in antibody-secreting plasma cells, however, the J chain has been seen to be expressed in earlier stages of B cell differentiation prior to Ig expression. J chain expression is believed to occur in the early stages of lymphoid cell differentiation as it is expressed in both B and T cell precursors. As cells develop, it seems that expression of the μ-chain becomes necessary for J chain synthesis.

The J chain gene is transcriptionally regulated through canonical PAX5 repression. As Pax5 is a common transcriptional regulator, the J chain is still expressed in plasma cells that secrete monomeric antibodies. In such cells it is believed to provide no function and is quickly degraded. In plasma cells that secrete monomeric IgA, a Pax5-independent mechanism is likely to prevent IgA dimerization.

== Phylogeny ==
Immunoglobulin J chain

Identifiers
- Symbol: Ig_J
- Pfam: PF15097
- InterPro: IPR024110
Available protein structures:
- PDB: IPR024110 PF15097 (ECOD; PDBsum)
- AlphaFold: IPR024110; PF15097

There is no known protein family with obvious homology to the J chain, so it is put into a family of its own in InterPro. Gene and exon organization indicate that it evolved from a duplicated CXCL chemokine gene, in a common ancestor of extant jawed vertebrates (Gnathostomes).

Unlike in mammals, not all mucosal polymeric immunoglobulins use the J chain. Xenopus are able to polymerize mucosal IgX (orthologous to IgA) in the absence of J chain, perhaps due to a loss of the conserved cysteine residues that link the J chain and Ig secretory tail. Some groups of bony fish including teleosts have no J chain gene, but remain able to secrete mucosal polymeric IgM and IgT (a teleost-specific mucousal Ig unrelated to IgA). In teleost fish, the PIGR has evolved to bind to the polymeric Ig without needing the J-chain.

Sharks do not express IgA and thus use J chain expression solely for the polymerization of IgM. This makes sharks an intriguing model organism in studying J chain regulation and polymerization without the confounding variables of mucosal secretion.
