= Polymeric immunoglobulin receptor =

Protein-coding gene in humans

PIGR
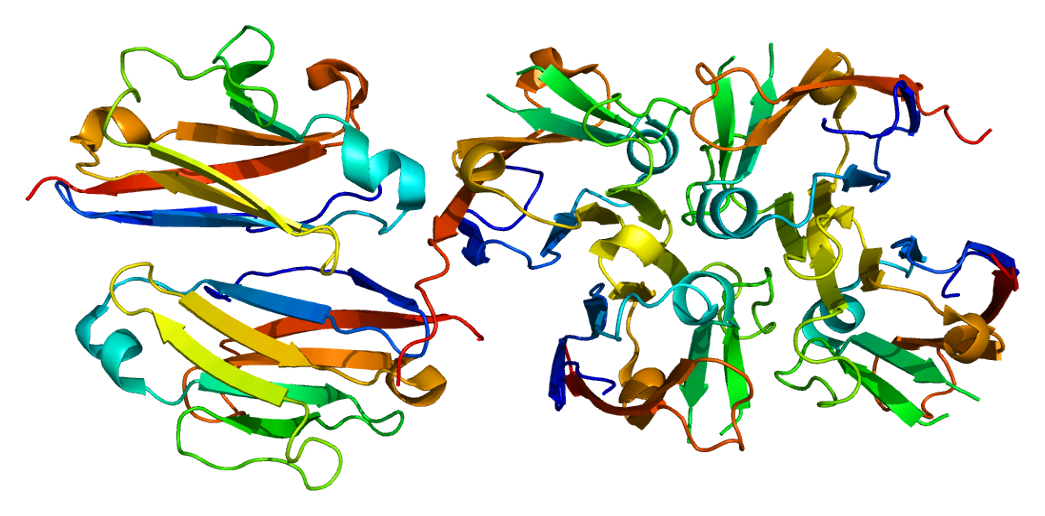

Identifiers
- Aliases: PIGR, Pigr, polymeric immunoglobulin receptor
- External IDs: OMIM: 173880; MGI: 103080; GeneCards: PIGR
Available structures
PDB	Ortholog search: PDBe RCSB
PDB	List of PDB id codes 1XED, 2OCW, 3CHN, 3CM9, 5D4K

Gene location (Human)
Chr.	Chromosome 1 (human)
Band	1q32.1	Start	206,928,522 bp
Band	1q32.1	End	206,946,466 bp

Gene location (Mouse)
Chr.	Chromosome 1 (mouse)
Band	1 E4|1 56.89 cM	Start	130,754,421 bp
Band	1 E4|1 56.89 cM	End	130,779,986 bp
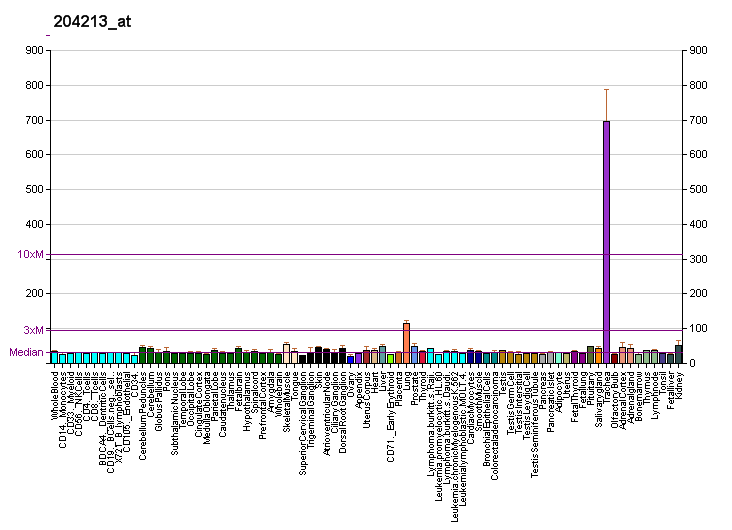
RNA expression pattern
Bgee	Human / Mouse (ortholog); Top expressed in: parotid gland; mucosa of sigmoid colon; mucosa of transverse colon; rectum; bronchial epithelial cell; duodenum; pylorus; jejunal mucosa; gallbladder; olfactory zone of nasal mucosa / Top expressed in: Ileal epithelium; left colon; crypt of lieberkuhn of small intestine; duodenum; Paneth cell; parotid gland; jejunum; lacrimal gland; left lobe of liver; submandibular gland; More reference expression data
BioGPS	More reference expression data
Gene ontology
Molecular function	polymeric immunoglobulin receptor activity; transcytosis; polymeric immunoglobulin binding
Cellular component	integral component of membrane; extracellular region; receptor complex; integral component of plasma membrane; extracellular exosome; membrane; extracellular space; plasma membrane; azurophil granule membrane
Biological process	Fc receptor signaling pathway; immunoglobulin transcytosis in epithelial cells mediated by polymeric immunoglobulin receptor; retina homeostasis; detection of chemical stimulus involved in sensory perception of bitter taste; epidermal growth factor receptor signaling pathway; receptor clustering; neutrophil degranulation
Sources:Amigo / QuickGO
Orthologs
Databases	NCBI: entry; OMA: entry
Species	Human	Mouse
Entrez	5284	18703
Ensembl	ENSG00000162896	ENSMUSG00000026417
UniProt	P01833	O70570
RefSeq (mRNA)	NM_002644	NM_011082
RefSeq (protein)	NP_002635	NP_035212
Location (UCSC)	Chr 1: 206.93 – 206.95 Mb	Chr 1: 130.75 – 130.78 Mb
PubMed search
- Wikidata
View/Edit Human	View/Edit Mouse

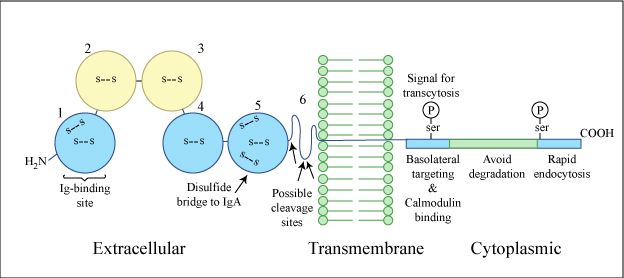
Structure of the polymeric Ig receptor (pIgR).

Polymeric immunoglobulin receptor (pIgR) is a transmembrane protein that in humans is encoded by the PIGR gene. It is an Fc receptor which facilitates the transcytosis of the soluble polymeric isoforms of immunoglobulin A and immunoglobulin M (pIg) and immune complexes. pIgRs are mainly located on the epithelial lining of mucosal surfaces of the gastrointestinal tract. The composition of the receptor is complex, including five immunoglobulin-like domains, a transmembrane region, and an intracellular domain. pIgR expression is under the strong regulation of cytokines, hormones, and pathogenic stimuli.

== Evolution ==
The existence of pIgR is conserved among tetrapods. The true PIGR emerged with the early amphibians; the duplication event results in today's PIGR and FCAMR.

Teleost fish have genes called PIGR, but they are probably not orthologous, merely homologous to tetrapod TIGR, having emerged via convergent evolution. This homolog only has two Ig-like domains instead of mammals' five, each most similar to mammal D1 and D4/D5. It does not bind to a J-chain because these fish have no such thing, but still functions in the same process of transcytosis of fish IgM and IgT.

The lagomorphs (rabbits and hares) have a very high mutation rate in their PIGR genes compared to the rest of the mammals. They also have multiple copies of IgA.

== Structure ==
pIgR is produced among others by intestinal epithelial cells (IECs) and bronchial epithelial cells. pIgR belongs to the family of type I transmembrane proteins. The extracellular portion of the protein contains five evolutionary conserved immunoglobulin-like domains and one C-terminal tail, which includes where proteolytic cleavage occurs to generate the secretory component. The quite long intracellular domain of the receptor, along with the transmembrane region, is responsible for the transduction of highly conserved signals.

=== Secretory component ===
During transcytosis, the ectodomain part of pIgR, the secretory component, is attached to the pIg ligand and later cleaved with the ligand to form fully functioning secreted pIg.

== Function ==
Polymeric immunoglobulin receptor is responsible for transcytosis of soluble dimeric IgA, pentameric IgM, and immune complexes from the basolateral to the apical mucosal epithelial cell surface. pIgR has a strong specificity to polymeric immunoglobulins and is not responsive to monomeric immunoglobulin. The ligand’s J-chain is responsible for the binding of pIgR to its ligand.

=== Transcytosis ===
The process of transporting polymeric immunoglobulins from the basolateral to apical side, known as transcytosis, is composed of several distinct steps. Transcytosis is initiated by either the binding of polymeric Ig (dimeric IgA or pentameric IgM) to the receptor or the phosphorylation of Ser-664 residue of the receptor. The internalization of both free and pIg-bound pIgR is mediated by clathrin coating. The internalized receptor is transported to basolateral early endosomes. The following step of transporting the pIgR across the cell (through tubulo-vesicular compartments to apical recycling endosome) is dependent on microtubules. When pIgR reaches the apical membrane, proteolytic cleavage generates either a free secretory component or a secretory component–pIg complex, which is released to the apical lumen. Cleavage occurs at the junction of the transmembrane region of the receptor and domain 5. The responsible proteolytic enzyme on the apical surface has not been identified, but may be a serine protease.

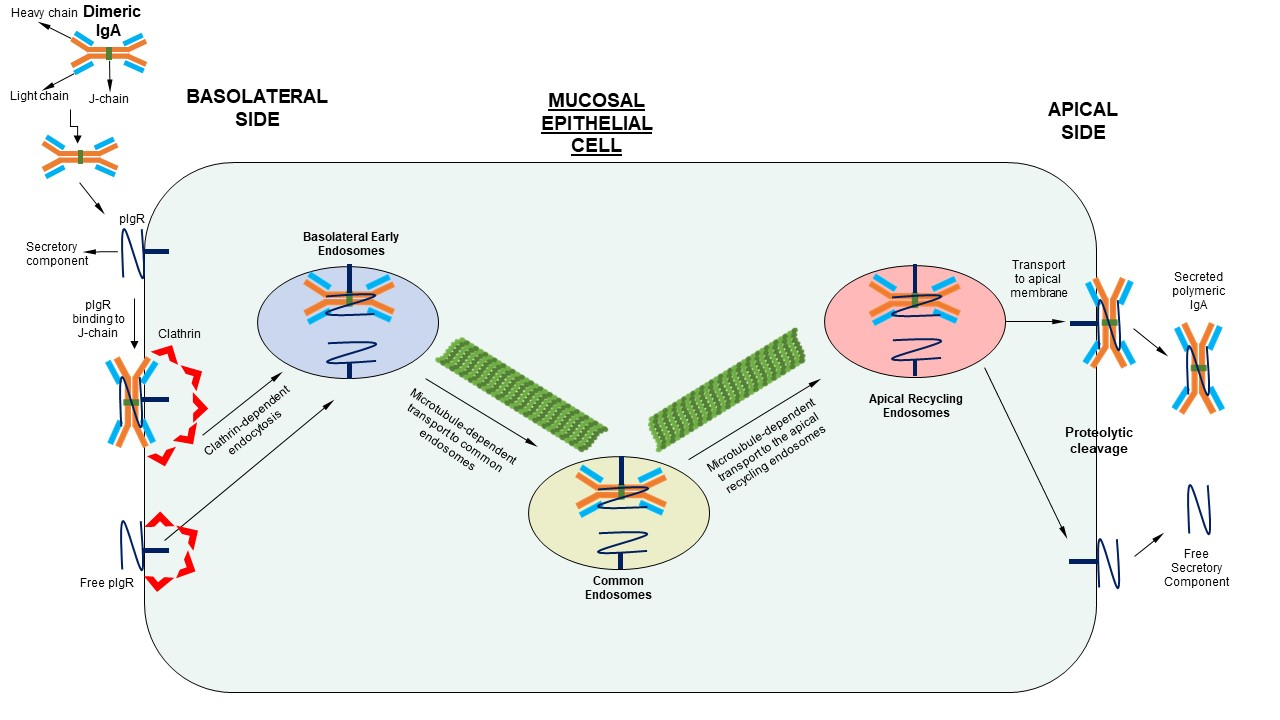
The diagram represents the process of transcytosis of dimeric IgA / free polymeric immunoglobulin receptor from the basolateral to apical side of a mucosal epithelial cell.

=== Elimination of immune complexes ===
pIgRs are capable of capturing IgA bound to an antigen (immune complexes (ICs)) with identical affinity as IgA and transport them to apical side. ICs result from the capture of an antigen by an antibody. IgA ICs are formed within the mucous membranes in response to foreign invasion. The accumulation of ICs on the basolateral side of mucous layers can have detrimental effects. Transcytosis of IgA ICs from the formation sites represents an important mechanism of eliminating circulating antigens and minimizing their negative effects.

== Regulation ==
=== Cytokinetic regulation ===
The expression of pIgR is critically regulated by the pro-inflammatory cytokines, such as IL-1, IL-4, TNF-α, and IFN-γ. The transcriptional regulation by different cytokines proceeds through similar pathways, involving the NF-kB feedback loop. Interaction of IL-1 and TNF-α with their receptors ultimately lead to transcriptional activation of PIGR gene due to nuclear translocation of NF-kB. NF-kB interacts with intron 1 of the PIGR gene to start pIgR mRNA synthesis.

Besides NF-kB pathway, the transcriptional induction also proceeds in response to IFN-γ, upregulating the expression of pIgR.

Additionally, instead of the usual antagonistic behavior, IL-4 acts synergistically with IFN-γ to induce pIgR transcription. Their combination exhibits an upregulating effect in PIGR expression because of the presence of STAT6 enhancer, the main downstream effector of IL-4, binding site in PIGR's intron 1.

=== Hormonal regulation ===
The level of pIgRs in the mucosal reproductive tract is highly dependent on the activity of sex hormones and correlates with estrous cycle phases. The peaks of pIgR expression at proestrus and estrus phases are due to the dominant activity of estrogen, which acts as a pIgR agonist. The low levels of pIgR during the diestrus are linked to the downregulating activity of progesterone, which peaks during this phase and is able to reverse the activity of estrogen. Androgens are the agonists of pIgR expression in both male and female reproductive tissues.

The 5’-flanking region of the Pigr gene contains a response element to glucocorticoids. This class of hormones increases the steady mRNA expression levels of pIgR of intestinal cells.

Prolactin elevates the levels of IRF-1 via Jak-STAT pathway. IRF-1 is known to be a direct agonist of pIgR expression. Considering this linkage, prolactin is believed to exhibit indirect upregulation of pIgR levels during pregnancy and lactation.

=== Pathogenic stimulation ===
IECs express a variety of Toll-like receptors (TLRs), activation of which ultimately leads to the pIgR upregulation during the infection. The most prominent modulators of pIgR regulation consist of TLR4 and TLR3, which recognize bacterial lipopolysaccharide and viral dsRNA respectively. TLR4, like the majority of TLRs, transduce the signal though MyD88 adaptor and execute the function via NF-kB, which stimulates the expression of pIgR by binding to intron 1 of the gene. TLR3, on the other hand, involves the regulation by the means of IRF-1, which is able to promote the transcription of PIGR gene by binding to exon 1.

== History ==
Per Brandtzaeg showed that secretory component acts as a plasma membrane receptor on epithelial cells for polymeric immunoglobulin A and immunoglobulin M. This was paradoxical, as secretory component is a soluble protein, whereas plasma membrane receptors are transmembrane proteins. Numerous models were proposed for how secretory component might work as a receptor, though none of these models resolved this paradox. Keith Mostov and colleagues found that secretory component was a proteolytic fragment of a transmembrane precursor, the pIgR, which led them to propose the currently accepted model
