= Duhring, West Virginia =

Unincorporated community in West Virginia, United States

- Unincorporated community
- Location within the state of West Virginia Duhring, West Virginia (the United States)
- Coordinates: 37°20′51″N 81°15′49″W
- Country: United States
- State: West Virginia
- County: Mercer
- Elevation: 2,260 ft (690 m)
- Time zone: UTC-5 (Eastern (EST))
  - Summer (DST): UTC-4 (EDT)
- Area codes: 304 & 681
- GNIS feature ID: 1538416

Duhring is an unincorporated community in Mercer County, West Virginia, United States. Duhring is 1 mile (1.6 km) southwest of Montcalm.

The community was named after an early settler.
