= Louis Adolphus Duhring =

American physician

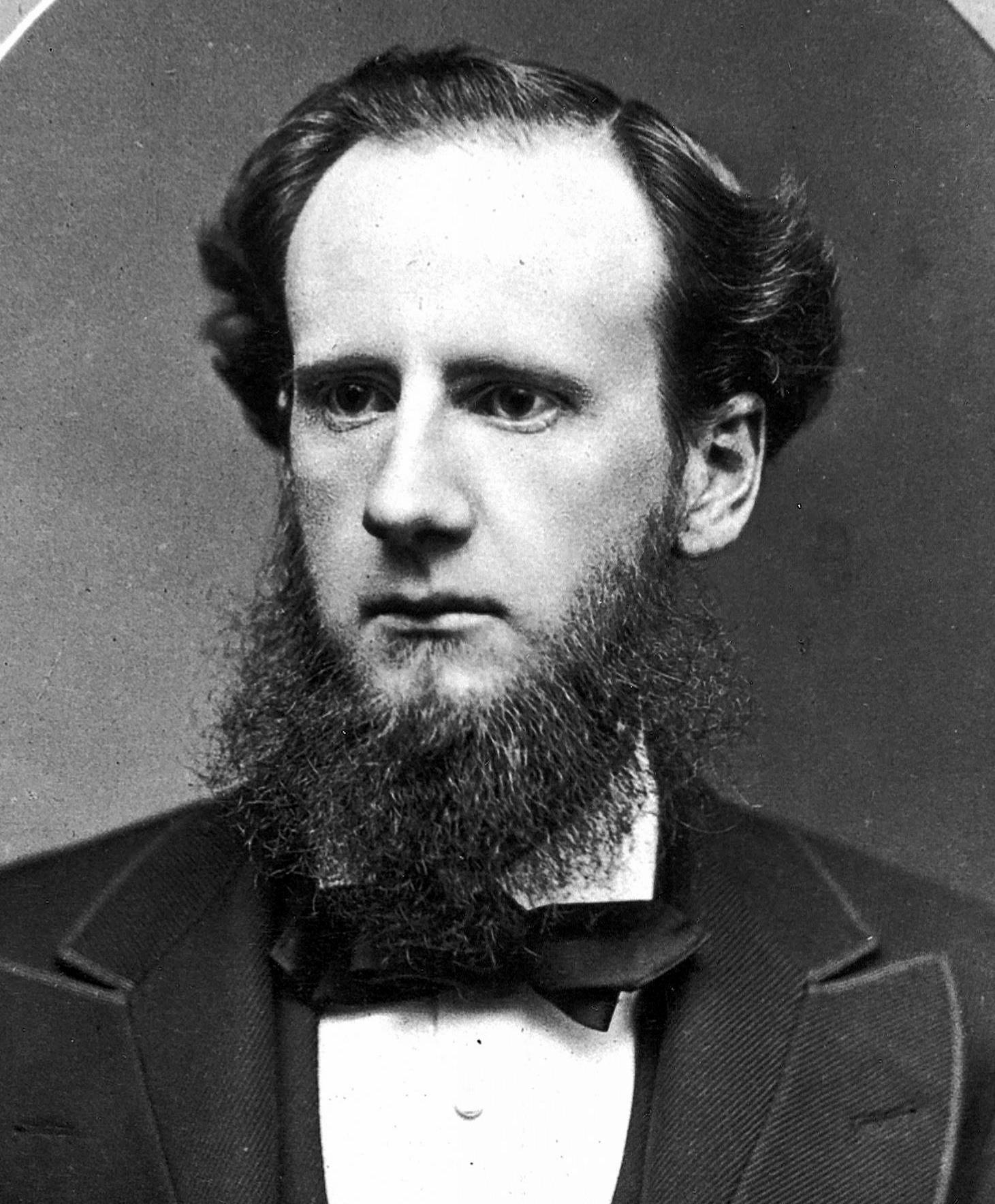
Duhring in 1867

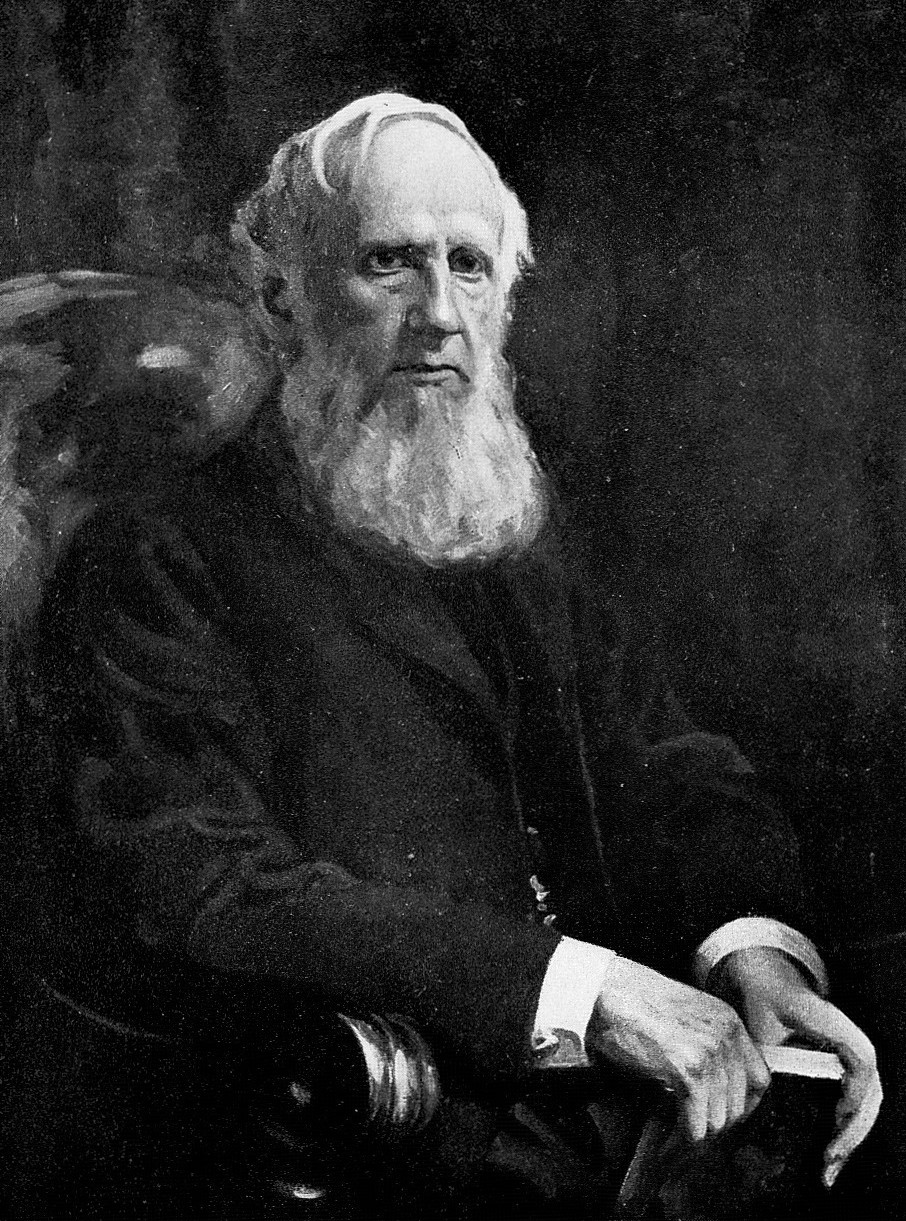
Louis Adolphus Duhring by Hugh H. Breckenridge

Louis Adolphus Duhring (December 23, 1845, Philadelphia – May 8, 1913, Philadelphia) was an American physician and professor of dermatology at the University of Pennsylvania. He is best remembered for having delineated dermatitis herpetiformis (also known as Duhring's disease); but he also described pruritus hiemalis ("winter itch"), and seborrheic dermatitis.

After a stint with the 32nd Regiment of Pennsylvania Volunteers in the American Civil War, Duhring enrolled at Penn's Medical School, graduating in 1867. During his time in medical school, he became a lecturer of dermatological diseases in 1865 at the University of Pennsylvania. From 1868 he continued his studies in Vienna, Paris and London, returning to Philadelphia in 1870, where he established the Dispensary for Skin Diseases. He was director of the dispensary until 1880. In the meantime he became a visiting dermatologist at the department of skin diseases at Blockley Hospital (1876-1887).

In 1875 he gained his clinical professorship at Penn, becoming a full professor in 1891. In 1876 he was a founding member of the American Dermatological Association (twice serving as its president). He was the author of two major works, Atlas of Skin Diseases (1876–80) and A Practical Treatise on Diseases of the Skin (1877). The latter book established Duhring as a top authority in American dermatology. He also authored the encyclopedic Cutaneous Medicine, of which only two of several planned volumes were published, in 1895 and 1898.

Duhring died on May 8, 1913, due to an intestinal obstruction and resulting peritonitis. He was interred at Laurel Hill Cemetery in Philadelphia. Upon his death, a significant sum was bequeathed to Penn. In 1915, the During Wing of the Fisher Fine Arts Library was erected in his honor.
