= Sulfamethoxypyridazine =

Chemical compound

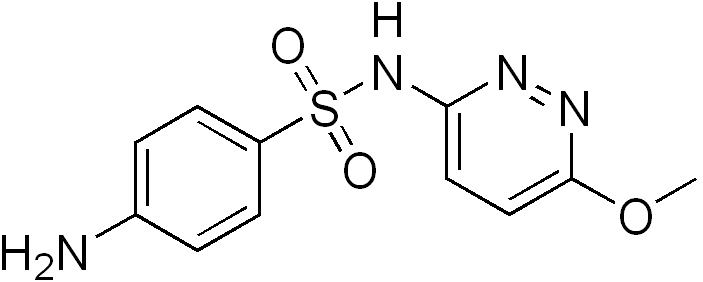

Clinical data
- AHFS/Drugs.com: International Drug Names
- ATC code: J01ED05 (WHO) QJ01EQ15 (WHO)

Identifiers
- IUPAC name: 4-amino-N-(6-methoxypyridazin-3-yl)benzenesulfonamide
- CAS Number: 80-35-3
- PubChem CID: 5330
- ChemSpider: 5139
- UNII: T034E4NS2Z
- KEGG: D02439
- ChEBI: CHEBI:102516
- ChEMBL: ChEMBL268869
- CompTox Dashboard (EPA): DTXSID5023611
- ECHA InfoCard: 100.001.157

Chemical and physical data
- Formula: C_{11}H_{12}N_{4}O_{3}S
- Molar mass: 280.30 g·mol^{−1}
- 3D model (JSmol): Interactive image
- SMILES: O=S(=O)(Nc1nnc(OC)cc1)c2ccc(N)cc2
- InChI: InChI=1S/C11H12N4O3S/c1-18-11-7-6-10(13-14-11)15-19(16,17)9-4-2-8(12)3-5-9/h2-7H,12H2,1H3,(H,13,15); Key:VLYWMPOKSSWJAL-UHFFFAOYSA-N

Sulfamethoxypyridazine is a sulfonamide antibacterial.

It is prescribed for vaginal irritation, and severe acute thrush.

It is also used in the treatment of Dermatitis herpetiformis, where it is an alternative therapy to Dapsone.

Sulfamethoxypyridazine is supplied as 500mg tablets.
