= Tadeusz Chorzelski =

Polish dermatologist

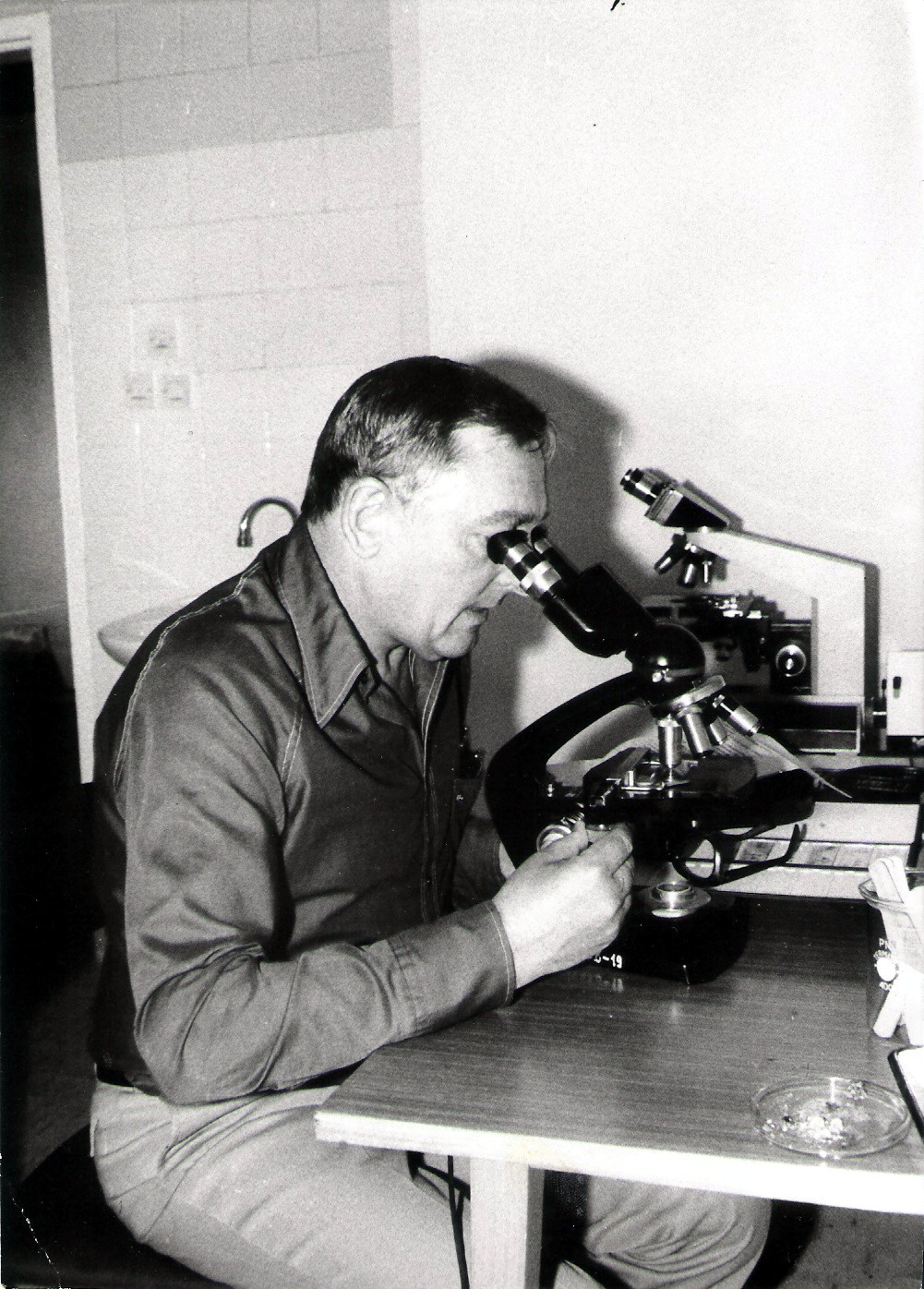
Tadeusz Chorzelski

Tadeusz P. Chorzelski (1928–1999) was a Polish dermatologist. He was one of the founders of immunodermatology. He published more than 400 original research papers, 28 book chapters, and 5 monographs. Chorzelski was elected a member honoris causa of the national societies of Great Britain, France, Germany, Austria, Mexico and Norway.

== General references ==
- Jabłońska, Stefania; Mroczkowski, Tomasz F. (January 2010). "Reminiscences of Professor Tadeusz Chorzelski (May 21, 1928–January 21, 1999)". Clinics in Dermatology. 28 (1): 115–118. doi:10.1016/j.clindermatol.2009.11.001. PMID 20082961.
- Jabłońska, Stefania (August 1999). "Tadeusz Chorzelski – (1928–1999)". Der Hautarzt. 50 (8): 599–600. doi:10.1007/s001050050968. PMID 10460308.
