= Immunoglobulin A =

Antibody that plays a crucial role in the immune function of mucous membranes

Schematic of immunoglobulin A dimer showing H-chain (blue), L-chain (red), J-chain (magenta) and secretory component (yellow).

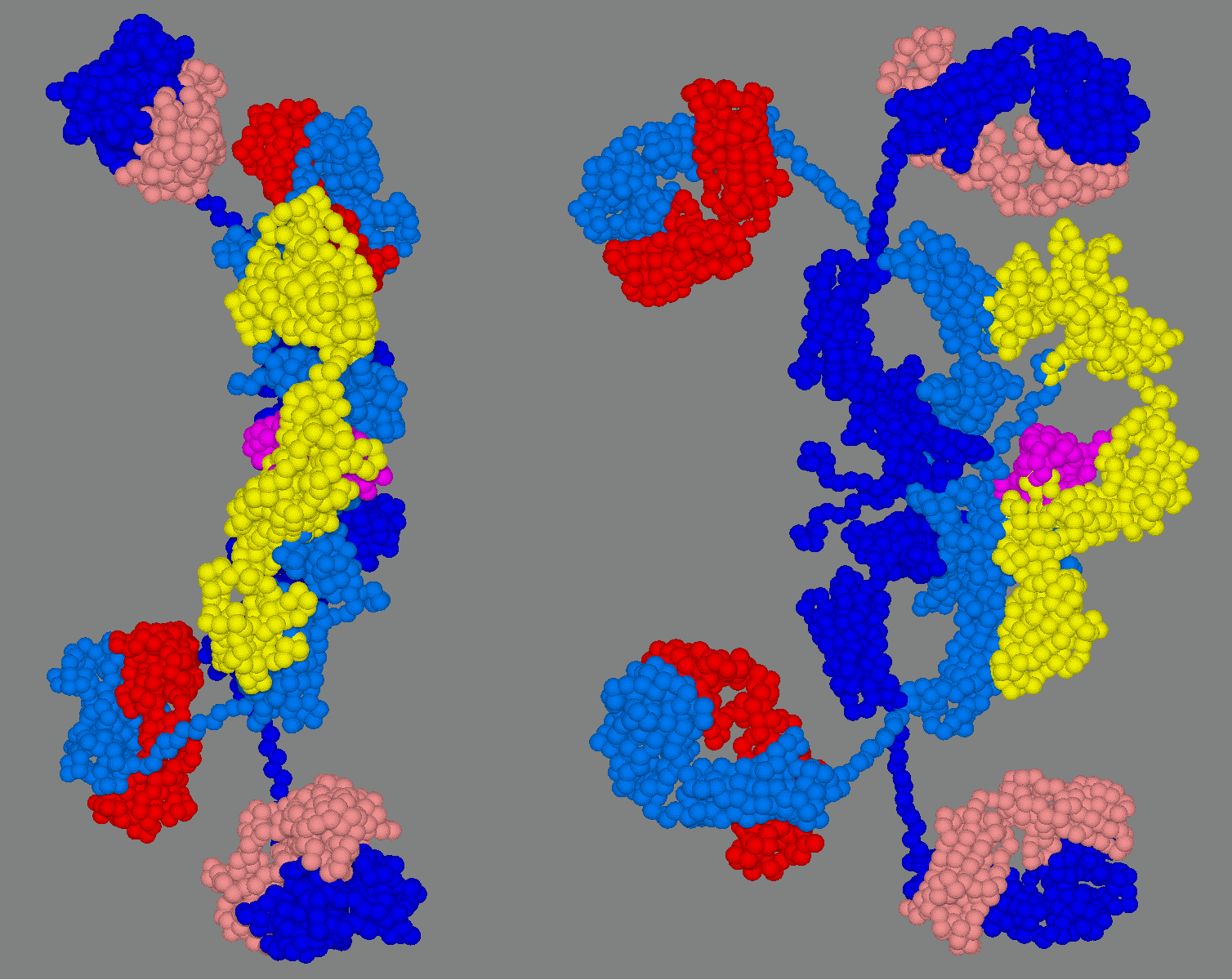
Two views, one rotated 90 degrees with respect to the other, of the amino acid chains comprising secretory IgA1. Colors are: H-chains (blue and light blue), L-chains (red and light red), J-chain (magenta) and the secretory component (yellow). Coordinates of each backbone carbon atom were derived PDB entry 3CHN.

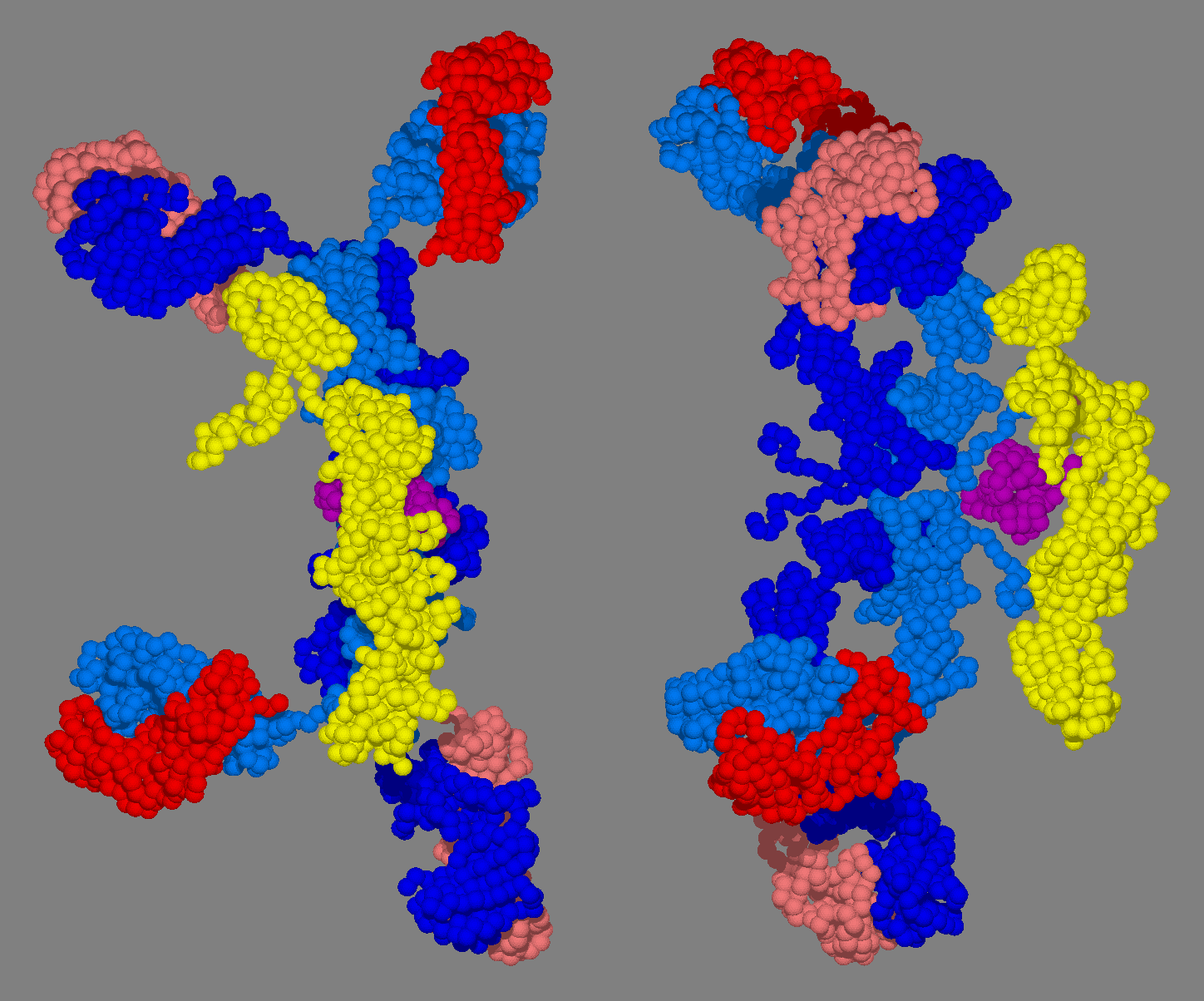
Two views, one rotated 90 degrees with respect to the other, of the amino acid chains comprising secretory IgA2. Colors are: H-chains (blue and light blue), L-chains (red and light red), J-chain (magenta) and the secretory component (yellow). Coordinates of each backbone carbon atom were derived PDB entry 3cm9.

Immunoglobulin A (IgA, also referred to as sIgA in its secretory form) is an antibody that plays a role in the immune function of mucous membranes. The amount of IgA produced in association with mucosal membranes is greater than all other types of antibody combined. In absolute terms, between three and five grams are secreted into the intestinal lumen each day. This represents up to 15% of total immunoglobulins produced throughout the body.

Primate IgA has two subclasses (IgA1 and IgA2) and can be produced as a monomeric as well as a dimeric form. The IgA dimeric form is the most prevalent and, when it has bound the Secretory component, is also called secretory IgA (sIgA). sIgA is the main immunoglobulin found in mucous secretions, including tears, saliva, sweat, colostrum and secretions from the genitourinary tract, gastrointestinal tract, prostate and respiratory epithelium. It is also found in small amounts in blood. The secretory component of sIgA protects the immunoglobulin from being degraded by proteolytic enzymes; thus, sIgA can survive in the harsh gastrointestinal tract environment and provide protection against microbes that multiply in body secretions. sIgA can also inhibit inflammatory effects of other immunoglobulins. IgA is a poor activator of the complement system, and opsonizes only weakly.

== Forms ==
=== IgA1 vs. IgA2 ===
Primate IgA exists in two isotypes, IgA1 and IgA2. They are both heavily glycosylated proteins. While IgA1 predominates in serum (~80%), IgA2 percentages are higher in secretions than in serum (~35% in secretions); the ratio of IgA1 and IgA2 secreting cells varies in the different lymphoid tissues of the human body:

- IgA1 is the predominant IgA subclass found in serum. Most lymphoid tissues have a predominance of IgA1-producing cells.
- In IgA2, the heavy and light chains are not linked with disulfide, but with non-covalent bonds. In secretory lymphoid tissues (e.g., gut-associated lymphoid tissue, or GALT), the share of IgA2 production is larger than in the non-secretory lymphoid organs (e.g. spleen, peripheral lymph nodes).

Both IgA1 and IgA2 have been found in external secretions like colostrum, maternal milk, tears and saliva, where IgA2 is more prominent than in the blood. The IgA1:A2 ratio in serum is 9:1, compared to 4:6 in secretions. Polysaccharide antigens tend to induce more IgA2 than protein antigens.

The heavy chain of IgA1, in contrast to IgA2, features an extended hinge region. This is thought to allow IgA1 to adapt more effectively to varying epitope spacings on multivalent antigens, while also presenting less resistance to bacterial proteases.

Both IgA1 and IgA2 can be in membrane-bound form (see B-cell receptor).

=== Monomeric vs. polymeric IgA ===
IgA can be secreted by B cells either as a monomer or as a covalently-linked polymer/oligomer of multiple IgA subunits. Polymers of 2–4 IgA monomers, but most commonly 2 (dimers), are covalently linked to one molecule of the J chain (joining chain) inside the B cell prior to secretion as a J chain-coupled polymeric IgA molecule. The J chain is a polypeptide with a backbone molecular mass of 15 kDa but typically ~18 kDa when glycosylated, rich with cysteine and structurally completely different from other immunoglobulin chains. As such, the molecular weight of a J chain-coupled dimer of IgA is ~340 kDa.

The oligomer forms of IgA in the external (mucosal) secretions also contain a polypeptide of a much larger molecular mass (70 kDa) called the secretory component that is produced by epithelial cells. This molecule originates from the poly-Ig receptor (130 kDa) that is responsible for the uptake and transcellular transport of J chain-containing polymeric (but not monomeric, which is devoid of J chain) IgA across the epithelial cells and into secretions such as tears, saliva, sweat and gut fluid.

== Physiology ==
=== Serum IgA ===
In the blood, IgA interacts with an Fc receptor called FcαRI (or CD89), which is expressed on immune effector cells, to initiate inflammatory reactions. Ligation of FcαRI by IgA containing immune complexes causes antibody-dependent cell-mediated cytotoxicity (ADCC), degranulation of eosinophils and basophils, phagocytosis by monocytes, macrophages, and neutrophils, and triggering of respiratory burst activity by polymorphonuclear leukocytes. Unlike IgM and IgG, which activate complement through the classical pathway, IgA can activate complement via the alternative and lectin pathways.

=== Secretory IgA ===
The high prevalence of IgA in mucosal areas is a result of a cooperation between plasma cells that produce polymeric IgA (pIgA), and mucosal epithelial cells that express polymeric immunoglobulin receptor (pIgR). Polymeric IgA (mainly the secretory dimer) is produced by plasma cells in the lamina propria adjacent to mucosal surfaces. It binds to the pIgR on the basolateral surface of epithelial cells, and is taken up into the cell via endocytosis. The receptor-IgA complex passes through the cellular compartments before being secreted on the luminal surface of the epithelial cells, still attached to the receptor. Proteolysis of the receptor occurs, and the dimeric IgA molecule, along with a portion of the receptor known as the secretory component (SC), is free to diffuse throughout the lumen, with dimeric IgA and SC together forming the so-called secretory IgA (sIgA) In the gut, IgA can bind to the mucus layer covering the epithelial cells. In this way, a barrier capable of neutralizing threats before they reach the epithelial cells is formed.

Secretory IgA levels fluctuate diurnally, with the highest levels found in the small intestine and feces around ZT6, the middle of the light period. The regulation of IgA secretion is related to the microbiota, and IgA is known to control specific members of oscillating microbes through direct interactions. However, the underlying cause of the rhythmic secretion of IgA is not completely understood and may differ from one region of the body to another.

Production of sIgA against specific antigens depends on sampling of M cells and underlying dendritic cells, T cell activation, and B cell class switching in GALT, mesenteric lymph nodes, and isolated lymphoid follicles in the small intestine.

sIgA primarily acts by blockading epithelial receptors (e.g. by binding their ligands on pathogens), by sterically hindering attachment to epithelial cells, and by immune exclusion. Immune exclusion is a process of agglutinating polyvalent antigens or pathogens by crosslinking them with antibody, trapping them in the mucus layer, and/or clearing them peristaltically. The oligosaccharide chains of the component of IgA can associate with the mucus layer that sits atop epithelial cells. Since sIgA is a poor opsonin and activator of complement, simply binding a pathogen isn't necessarily enough to contain it—specific epitopes may have to be bound to sterically hinder access to the epithelium.

Clearance of IgA is mediated at least in part by asialoglycoprotein receptors, which recognizes galactose-terminating IgA N-glycans.

sIgA is capable of re-entering the circulation through a pathway that has not yet been fully elucidated. The involvement of certain active transport mechanisms cannot be ruled out, but substantial evidence also supports the role of passive leakage, particularly in conditions associated with impaired intestinal barrier function. In patients with acute-on-chronic liver failure (ACLF) syndrome characterized by multi-organ failure, elevated serum sIgA levels demonstrate a strong correlation with short-term mortality.

== Pathology ==
=== Genetic ===
Decreased or absent IgA due to an inherited inability to produce IgA is termed selective IgA deficiency and can produce a clinically significant immunodeficiency.

Anti-IgA antibodies, sometimes present in individuals with low or absent IgA, can result in serious anaphylactic reactions when transfused with blood products that incidentally contain IgA. However, most persons with suspected IgA anaphylactic reactions had experienced acute generalized reactions that were from causes other than anti-IgA transfusion.

=== Microbial ===
Neisseria species including Neisseria gonorrhoeae (which causes gonorrhea), Streptococcus pneumoniae, and Haemophilus influenzae type B all release a protease that destroys IgA. Additionally, Blastocystis species have been shown to have several subtypes that generate cysteine and aspartic protease enzymes which degrade human IgA.

=== Autoimmune and immune-mediated ===
IgA nephropathy is caused by IgA deposits in the kidneys. The pathogenesis involves the production of hypoglycosylated IgA1, which accumulates and subsequently leads to the formation of immune complexes and the production of IgA-specific IgG, further leading to tissue inflammation.

Celiac disease involves IgA pathology due to the presence of IgA antiendomysial antibodies. Additional testing has been conducted using IgA trans-glutaminase autoantibodies which has been identified as a specific and sensitive for the detection of celiac disease.

Henoch–Schönlein purpura (HSP) is a systemic vasculitis caused by deposits of IgA and complement component 3 (C3) in small blood vessels. HSP occurs usually in small children and involves the skin and connective tissues, scrotum, joints, gastrointestinal tract and kidneys. It usually follows an upper respiratory infection and resolves within a couple weeks as the liver clears out the IgA aggregates.

Linear IgA bullous dermatosis and IgA pemphigus are two examples of IgA-mediated immunobullous diseases. IgA-mediated immunobullous diseases can often be difficult to treat even with usually effective medications such as rituximab.

=== Drug-induced ===
Vancomycin can induce a linear IgA bullous dermatosis in some patients.

== In other animals ==
IgA is an invention of the tetrapods; it is not found in fish.

Amphibian IgA is known as IgX. Unlike all other forms of IgA (birds, reptiles, mammals), frog IgA/X cannot bind the J chain.

Most mammals have only one IgA gene corresponding to human IgA2; IgA1 is a more recent, subfunctionalized duplication found in primates. The other group known for having IgA is the lagomorphs (rabbits and hares).

== See also ==
- List of target antigens in pemphigus
- TGF beta
- Immunoglobulin E (IgE)
- Immunoglobulin G (IgG)
- Immunoglobulin M (IgM)
