= Vinculin family =

Protein family

Identifiers
- Symbol: Vinculin
- Pfam: PF01044
- InterPro: IPR006077
- PROSITE: PDOC00568
- SCOP2: 1dow / SCOPe / SUPFAM
Available protein structures:
- PDB: 1tr2B:3-1133 1syqA:3-257 1rkeA:3-257 1rkcA:3-257 1qkrB:973-1134 1u6hA:3-258 1st6A:3-1134 1zvzA:3-258 1zw2A:3-258 1zw3A:3-258 1t01A:3-253 1xwjA:3-258 1dovA:82-262 1dowA:57-261 1h6gB:377-632 1l7cC:385-651 IPR006077 PF01044 (ECOD; PDBsum)
- AlphaFold: IPR006077; PF01044

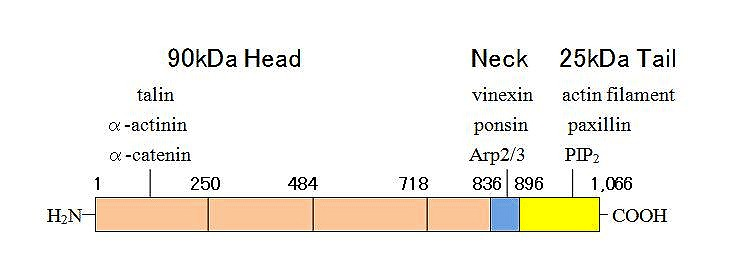
Vinculin domain structure

Vinculin is a eukaryotic protein that seems to be involved in the attachment of the actin-based microfilaments to the plasma membrane. Vinculin is located at the cytoplasmic side of focal contacts or adhesion plaques. In addition to actin, vinculin interacts with other structural proteins such as talin and alpha-actinins.

Vinculin is a large protein of 116 kDa (about a 1000 residues). Structurally the protein consists of an acidic N-terminal domain of about 90 kDa separated from a basic C-terminal domain of about 25 kDa by a proline-rich region of about 50 residues. The central part of the N-terminal domain consists of a variable number (3 in vertebrates, 2 in Caenorhabditis elegans) of repeats of a 110 amino acids domain.

Alpha-catenins are evolutionary related to vinculin. Catenins are proteins that associate with the cytoplasmic domain of a variety of cadherins. The association of catenins to cadherins produces a complex which is linked to the actin filament network, and which seems to be of primary importance for cadherins cell-adhesion properties. Three different types of catenins seem to exist: alpha, beta, and gamma. Alpha-catenins are proteins of about 100 kDa which are evolutionary related to vinculin. In terms of their structure the most significant differences are the absence, in alpha-catenin, of the repeated domain and of the proline-rich segment.

== Subfamilies ==
- Vinculin InterPro: IPR000633
- Alpha-catenin InterPro: IPR001033

== Human proteins containing this domain ==
CTNNA1; CTNNA2; CTNNA3; CTNNAL1; VCL;
