= Pre-cancer of the breast =

Pre-cancer of the breast is a precancerous condition of the breast. It may eventually develop into breast cancer. There are two types:

- Ductal carcinoma in situ, the most common type of breast pre-cancer
- Lobular carcinoma in situ, pre-cancer of the breast that is outside the milk ducts
