= Hereditary lobular breast cancer =

Hereditary lobular breast cancer is a rare inherited cancer predisposition associated with pathogenic CDH1 (gene) germline mutations, and without apparent correlation with the hereditary diffuse gastric cancer syndrome. Research studies identified novel CDH1 germline variants in women with diagnosed lobular breast cancer (in invasive and/or in situ histotype) and without any family history of gastric carcinoma. Firstly, in 2018 Giovanni Corso et al. defined this syndrome as a new cancer predisposition and the Authors suggested additional clinical criteria to testing CDH1 in lobular breast cancer patients. In 2020, the International Gastric Cancer Linkage Consortium recognized officially that the hereditary lobular breast cancer is a possible independent syndrome. To date, there are reported about 40 families clustering for lobular breast cancer and associated with CDH1 germline mutations but without association with diffuse gastric cancer. Other recent studies demonstrated a possible correlation between hereditary lobular breast cancer and gastric cancer risk.

== CDH1 inactivation in lobular breast cancer ==
In a CDH1 (gene) wild-type situation, lobules are well-organized structures characterized by the cell-cell adhesion mediated through the homophilic binding of E-cadherin molecules on adjacent cells. In case of a CDH1 (gene) mutation the E-cadherin function can be deregulated, with a decreased cell-cell adhesion and increased cell proliferation, so-called lobular hyperplasia. Subsequently, in case of a second-hit CDH1 (gene) inactivation, E-cadherin protein expression is undetectable and, consequently, it disrupts the organization of the lobule. During this pathway, abnormal cells emerge and accumulate in the lobules giving rise to lobular intraepithelial neoplasia. Finally, cancer cells disrupt the basement membrane and invade surrounding breast tissues, a stage that is classified as invasive lobular carcinoma.

== Criteria for genetic screening ==
Clinical criteria for genetic testing were suggested as following: (a) bilateral lobular breast cancer with or without family history of breast cancer, with age at onset <50 years; and (b) unilateral lobular breast cancer with family history of breast cancer, with age at onset <45 years. In this context, it has been estimated that the frequency of E-cadherin germline mutation is a rare event, affecting about 3% of the screened population. However, there are ongoing studies to assess the penetrance and the cancer risk in the hereditary lobular breast cancer syndrome.

== Measures for risk management ==
Actions to minimize the risk are prophylactic bilateral mastectomy, flat closure without reconstruction or six-month breast surveillance. In case of important family history for breast cancer with CDH1 (gene) germline mutations, prophylactic bilateral mastectomy with or without breast reconstruction is recommended after a careful genetic counseling. In general, as well in hereditary lobular breast cancer associated with CDH1 (gene) mutations, in absence of family history for gastric cancer, prophylactic gastrectomy is not indicated; therefore, yearly endoscopic surveillance should be purposed. In case of breast surveillance only, annual breast magnetic resonance imaging followed by mammography and ultrasound at six months interval, are recommended. Chemoprevention with low-dose Tamoxifen is also considered.
