= Giovanni Corso =

Italian academic and surgeon

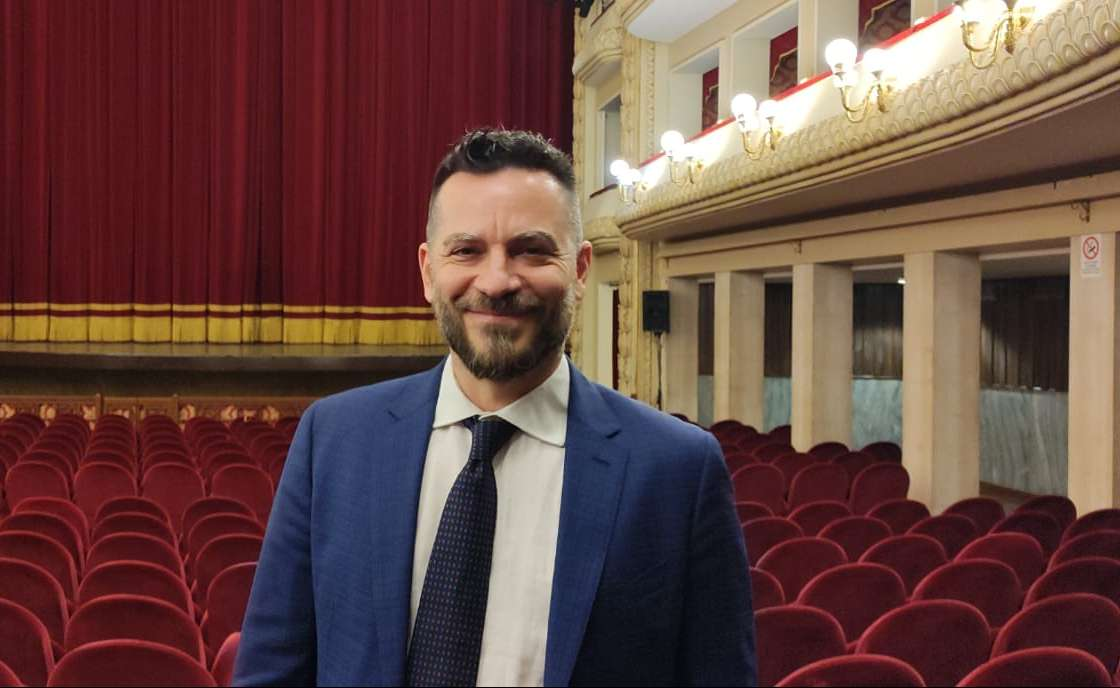
- Occupations: Academic and surgeon

Academic background
- Education: University of Siena, University of Porto

Academic work
- Institutions: University of Milan; European Cancer Prevention Organization

Giovanni Corso (born June 15, 1977) is an Italian academic and surgeon. He is associate professor at University of Milan and breast cancer surgeon at the European Institute of Oncology in Milan. Corso is the current president of the European Cancer Prevention Organization and the editor-in-chief of the European Journal of Cancer Prevention. His main research activities are on hereditary diffuse gastric cancer and hereditary lobular breast cancer associated with Cadherins disfunction.

== Biography ==
Corso graduated MD cum laude at the University of Siena Italy in 2002. He specialized in general surgery in 2009, and received PhD in Medicine and Molecular Oncology at the University of Porto Portugal.

== Books (as editor) ==
- Corso, Giovanni; Roviello, Franco, eds. (August 29, 2013). "Spotlight on Familial and Hereditary Gastric Cancer". SpringerLink. doi:10.1007/978-94-007-6570-2. ISBN 978-94-007-6569-6. S2CID 34265150.
- Corso, Giovanni; Veronesi, Paolo; Roviello, Franco, eds. (2023). "Hereditary Gastric and Breast Cancer Syndrome". SpringerLink. doi:10.1007/978-3-031-21317-5. ISBN 978-3-031-21316-8. S2CID 257560473.

== Awards and honours ==
- 2011 American Society of Clinical Oncology (ASCO) merit award Gastrointestinal Cancer Symposium, San Francisco, USA
- 2023 World Top 2% list Stanford University, USA
- 2024 Guerrieri award, Reggio Calabria, Italy
- 2024 World Top 2% list Stanford University, USA
- 2024 The Good Ambassador, Rome, Italy
- 2026 Excellence of Southern Italy, Italian Parliament, Rome, Italy
- 2026 World Top 2% list Stanford University, USA
- 2026 Certificate of appreciation Baku Women's Cancer Forum, Baku, Azerbaijan
