= Lobular carcinoma =

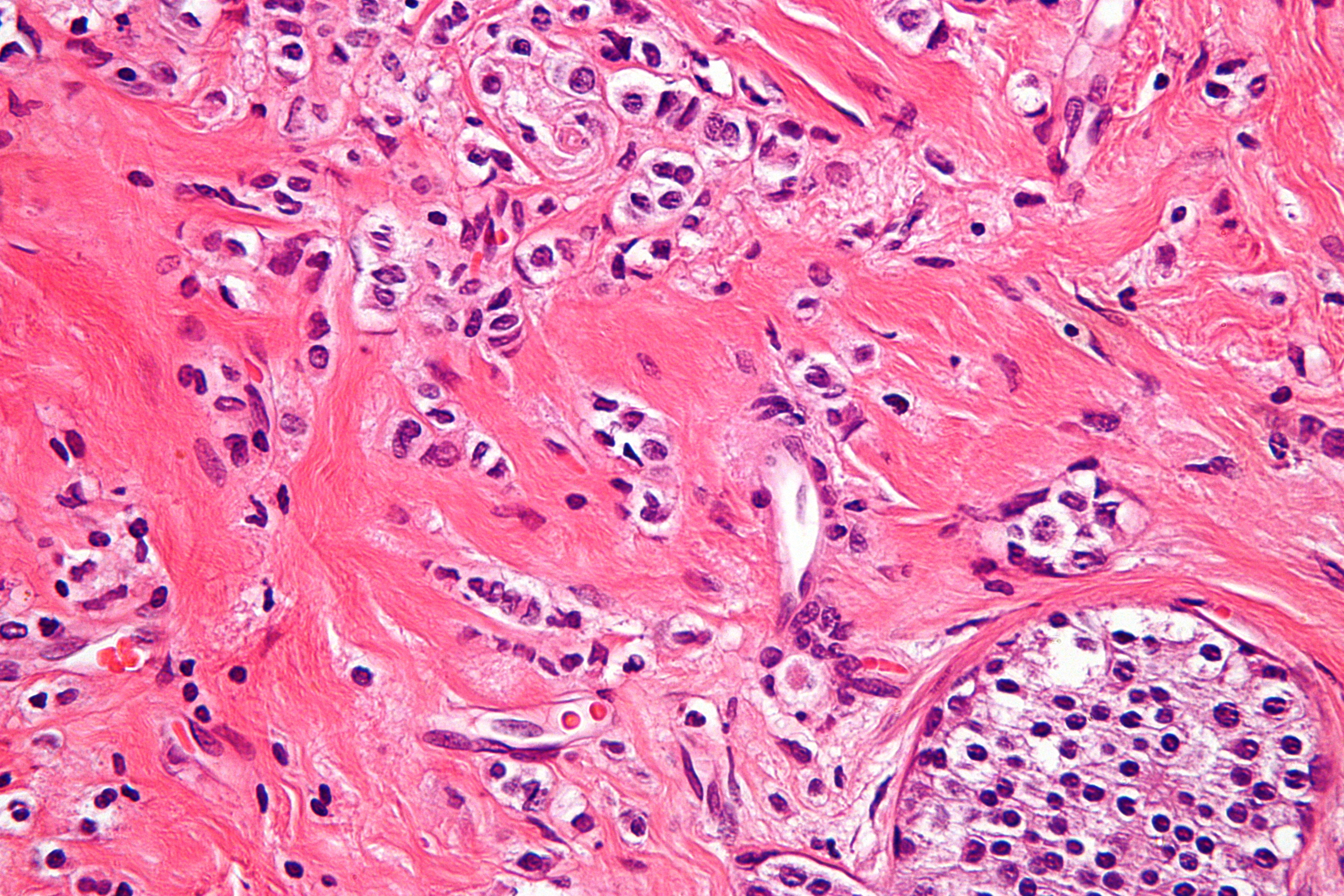
- Micrograph of lobular carcinoma. H&E stain.

Lobular carcinoma is a form of tumor which primarily affects the lobules of a gland.

It is sometimes considered equivalent to "terminal duct carcinoma".

If not otherwise specified, it generally refers to breast cancer. Examples include:

- Lobular carcinoma in situ
- Invasive lobular carcinoma
