= Lobular neoplasia =

Lobular neoplasia can refer to:

- Lobular carcinoma in situ
- Invasive lobular carcinoma
