= European Journal of Cancer Prevention =

- Language: English
- Edited by: Giovanni Corso

Publication details
- History: 1991-present
- Publisher: Lippincott Williams & Wilkins
- Frequency: Bimonthly
- Impact factor: 2.6 (2025)

Standard abbreviations
- ISO 4: Eur. J. Cancer Prev.

Indexing
- CODEN: EJUPEK
- ISSN: 0959-8278 (print); 1473-5709 (web)

Links
- Journal homepage; Online archive

The European Journal of Cancer Prevention (print: ISSN 0959-8278, online: ISSN 1473-5709) is the official journal of the European Cancer Prevention Organization. It was established in 1991 and is published bimonthly by Lippincott Williams & Wilkins. The journal focuses on raising awareness of the various forms of cancer prevention as well as stimulating research and innovation. The articles cover a wide scope of field areas, including descriptive and metabolic epidemiology, histopathology, lifestyle issues, environment, genetics, biochemistry, molecular biology, microbiology, clinical medicine, intervention trials and public education, basic laboratory studies, and special group studies. The current editor in chief is prof. Giovanni Corso. According to the 2025 Journal Citation Reports the journal has an impact factor of 2.6, ranking it 197 of 334 journals in the category Oncology.
