= European Cancer Prevention Organization =

Cancer Prevention Organization

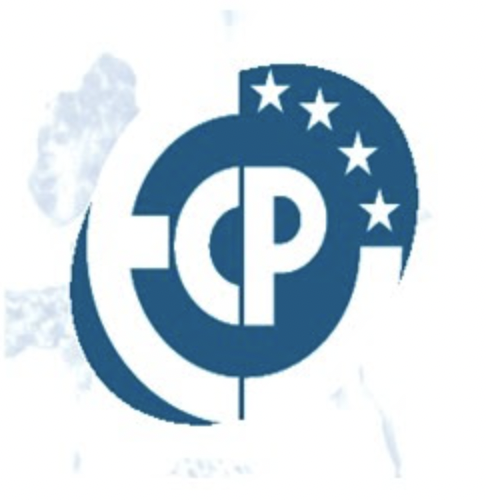
- Website: http://ecpo.org/

The European Cancer Prevention Organization (ECP) is a scientific organization representing physicians of all oncology sub-specialties with focus on cancer prevention. ECP was founded in 1981 with the support of several European scientists. The elected president of ECP is Professor Giovanni Corso. The Cancer Plan will aim to make at least 80% of the population aware of the Code by 2025.

== History ==
ECP was created in 1981 to promote European cooperation in cancer prevention studies. At that time, several scientists had become convinced that lifestyle factors could be related to the risk of 60% or more of all human cancers, thus offering hope that many could be actually prevented. Alain Maskens, a Belgian oncologist, circulated a document that proposed to create an organization with three main goals:

- to PROMOTE research in cancer prevention in Europe;
- to ORGANIZE an active cooperation at the European level;
- to INFORM the medical profession and the public in the area of cancer prevention.

Several experts agreed to form a scientific committee responsible for defining the project priorities, methods and structures. The Committee held its first meeting in Brussels on December 11 and 12, 1981. The participants included: Guy Blaudin de Thé (Lyon), Franco Conte (Genova), Daniela Daniele (Torino), Pierre Dellenbach (Strasbourg), Lajos Döbrössy (WHO Europe), Peter Ebbesen (Aarhus), Jean Faivre (Dijon), Pierre Jeandrain (Brussels), Joseph Joossens (Leuven), Cristina Kettlitz (Milano), Paul Mainguet (Louvain), Franz Oesch (Mainz), Marcel Roberfroid (Louvain), Leonardo Santi (Genova), James Scott (Leeds), Martine Van Glabbeke (EORTC), and Jean-Pierre Wolff (Villejuif). After a series of scientific presentations, the participants held discussions about methods and priorities, led by Prof. Scott, who became the first chairman of the ECP Scientific Committee. The main points which came out of this session were:

- emphasis should be on primary prevention rather than cancer detection,
- ECP should function on active involvement of individuals rather than official representation of institutions,
- active coordination should be sought with WHO and other international organizations,
- the information of the public was of central importance and should be fully integrated with the research programs,
- six initial working groups should be created: Tobacco and Cancer, Diet and Cancer, Sexual Factors and Cancer, Colon Cancer, Breast Cancer, Public Information.

Alain Maskens received the responsibility of coordinating the project, as first medical coordinator.

In the months that followed, a legal ECP entity was created for managing the administrative aspects of the organization. The working groups started accruing members, and preparing joint research projects. A first symposium was organized in March 1983, soon to be followed by others on an annual basis.

An important event occurred 10 years later, in October 1991: the launch of the European Journal of Cancer Prevention, the official journal of ECP. This major achievement was led by Dr. Michael Hill, who had by then replaced James Scott as Chairman of the ECP Scientific Committee, and by Dr. Attilio Giacosa, who had replaced Dr. Maskens as medical coordinator of ECP.

== Objectives ==
The aim of ECP has progressively changed, currently it includes epidemiology, nutrition, genetics, molecular biology, targeted therapies, surgery, and innovative research areas. Members come from different European countries, and they organize an annual meeting to discuss about progress in cancer prevention and novel research projects.

== Education ==
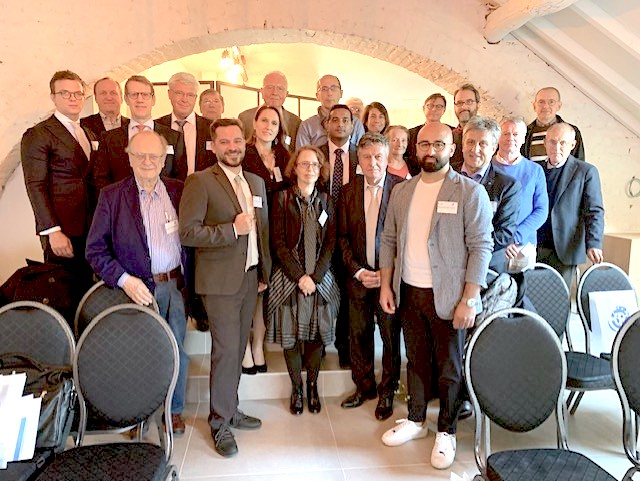

ECP offers several educational opportunities for physicians. These activities comprise scientific meetings, educational conferences, professional workshops, and special symposia about issues of particular relevance to oncologists and researchers. In 1992, the European Journal of Cancer Prevention was created and affiliated to the ECP organization as official journal.

== Presidents ==
- James Scott 1981–1991 (Leeds, United Kingdom)
- Michael Hill 1992–2003 (Londra, United Kingdom)
- Jaak Ph. Janssens 2004–2022 (Hasselt, Belgium)
- Giovanni Corso 2023–current (Milan, Italy)
