= Hereditary diffuse gastric cancer =

- Other names: HDGC
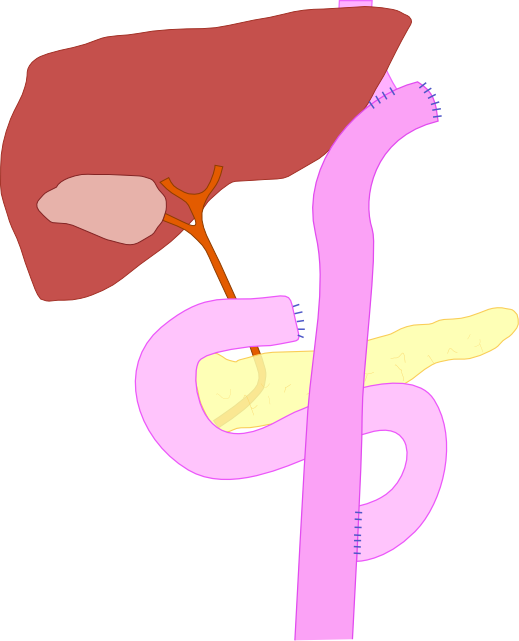
- Diagram demonstrating the result of a total gastrectomy, the most common prophylactic treatment of HDGC. In the procedure the esophagus is directly connected to the small intestine.
- Specialty: Oncology, Gastroenterology
- Complications: Lobular breast cancer
- Usual onset: 38 years of age (median)
- Causes: Mutation of the E-cadherin gene (CDH1)
- Risk factors: Stomach cancer
- Treatment: Total gastrectomy
- Frequency: 1-3% of gastric cancers

Hereditary diffuse gastric cancer (HDGC) is an inherited genetic syndrome most often caused by an inactivating mutation in the E-cadherin gene (CDH1) located on chromosome 16. Individuals who inherit an inactive copy of the CDH1 gene are at significantly elevated risk for developing stomach cancer. For this reason, individuals with these mutations will often elect to undergo prophylactic gastrectomy, or a complete removal of the stomach to prevent this cancer. Mutations in CDH1 are also associated with high risk of lobular breast cancers, and may be associated with a mildly elevated risk of colon cancer.

The most common form of stomach cancer associated with CDH1 mutations is diffuse-type adenocarcinoma. An estimated 70% of males and 56% of females who inherit an inactivating CDH1 mutation will develop this form of cancer by age 80. Female patients are also estimated to have a 42% lifetime risk of developing lobular breast cancer. The median age of gastric cancer diagnosis in individuals with a CDH1 inactivating mutation is 38 years of age, but cases have been reported as young as 14 years of age.

== Genetics ==
HDGC is inherited in an autosomal dominant fashion.

Hereditary diffuse gastric cancer is inherited as an autosomal dominant mutation of the E-cadherin gene (CDH1), which is located on chromosome 16q22.1. Because the condition only conveys significantly increased risk of cancer, it can be described as having incomplete penetrance.

The autosomal dominant nature of the mutations implies that inheriting just one mutated copy of the CDH1 gene is sufficient to induce a disease state. However, in order for cancer to arise in these individuals, both copies of the CDH1 gene must be inactive. Therefore, HDGC is developed through a loss of heterozygosity, in which the one unmutated copy of the CDH1 gene undergoes mutation or inactivation in some cells during the lifetime of the individual. This explains why the majority of individuals with CDH1 mutations will develop clinical apparent cancer, but some do not.

The gene mutated in HDGC, CDH1, codes for the E-cadherin protein. This protein serves numerous functions in cell-to-cell interactions, as well as intracellular signaling. Development of cancerous cells and malignancy may be related to several of these functions. One major function includes cell-cell adhesion facilitated by E-cadherin binding. Loss of this function may lead to dedifferentiation of cells and/or unregulated cell growth and replication. Another major function includes binding and sequestering of the beta-catenin transcription factor, keeping it inactive. Loss of this function may lead to overactivity of the transcription factor.

Genetic counseling and testing for CDH1 mutations are advised for families meeting the following criteria:

- Families with two or more documented cases of diffuse gastric cancer among first or second degree relatives, with at least one case diagnosed before age 50.
- Families with two or more documented cases of lobular breast cancers among first or second degree relatives, with or without diffuse gastric cancer in a first or second degree relative.
- Any individual diagnosed with diffuse gastric cancer before 35 years of age from a low incidence population.

=== Non-CDH1 Forms ===
Although CDH1 is by far the most common gene associated with HDGC, around 11% of cases arise in individuals who are negative for mutations in this gene. No other gene has been proven to cause HDGC, but possible associated genes include CTNNA1, BRCA2, STK11, SDHB, PRSS1, ATM, MSR1, and PALB2.

== Treatment ==
Surgical removal of the stomach (gastrectomy) is typically recommended for people after 20 years of age, and before 40 years of age in order to prevent development of diffuse gastric adenocarcinoma. However, individuals discovering CDH1 mutations after the age of 40 may still be considered for gastrectomy. The physical and psychological health of each individual should be considered in determining the optimal time to perform this operation. Younger individuals may wish to delay this procedure, and are often monitored with endoscopies and random biopsies. In addition, all individuals testing positive receive an initial endoscopy, at which any lesion is biopsied, as gastric cancer frequently begins without symptoms.

Females with CDH1 mutations also have an elevated risk of lobular breast carcinoma. Frequent screening for breast cancer with both mammography and breast MRI is common and recommended for these individuals.

The risk of colon cancer in those with CDH1 mutations is still unclear. Due to the mild risk that may be associated, individuals often receive screening colonoscopies at age 40, five years prior to the recommendation in the general population.

== Epidemiology ==
The median age at diagnosis is 38 years. An estimated 1-3% of gastric cancers are associated with hereditary cancer syndromes. HDGC is the most common hereditary cancer syndrome of the stomach.

HDGC was originally discovered through studies of Maori families in New Zealand that were noted to have increased incidences of gastric cancer. Detection of CDH1 mutations causing HDGC is highest in countries with low incidences of gastric cancer, such as the United States and Canada. Conversely, detection of CDH1 mutations is lowest in countries with high rates of gastric cancer, such as Portugal, Italy, and Japan. For this reason, some have pushed for increased genetic screening in countries with high rates of gastric cancer, as the rates may mask the incidence of CDH1 mutations.
