= Cadherin-1 =

Human protein-coding gene

CDH1
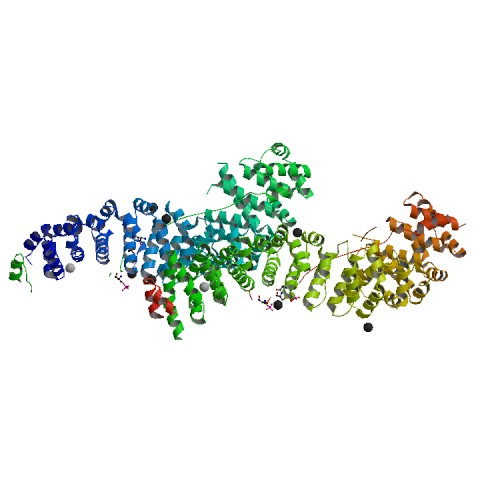

Identifiers
- Aliases: CDH1, Arc-1, CD324, CDHE, ECAD, LCAM, UVO, cadherin 1, BCDS1, E-cadherin, uvomorulin
- External IDs: OMIM: 192090; MGI: 88354; GeneCards: CDH1
Available structures
PDB	Ortholog search: PDBe RCSB
PDB	List of PDB id codes 1O6S, 2O72, 2OMT, 2OMU, 2OMV, 2OMX, 2OMY, 2OMZ, 3FF7, 3FF8, 3L6X, 3L6Y, 4ZT1, 4ZTE

Gene location (Human)
Chr.	Chromosome 16 (human)
Band	16q22.1	Start	68,737,292 bp
Band	16q22.1	End	68,835,537 bp

Gene location (Mouse)
Chr.	Chromosome 8 (mouse)
Band	8 D3|8 53.18 cM	Start	107,329,983 bp
Band	8 D3|8 53.18 cM	End	107,396,878 bp
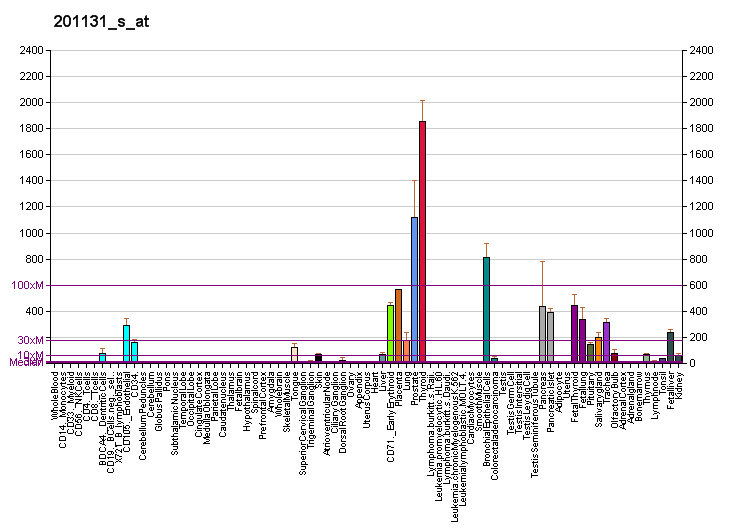

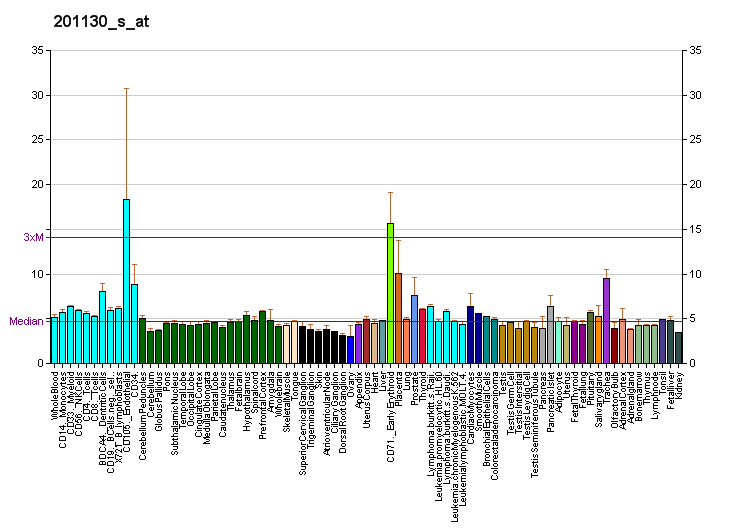
RNA expression pattern
Bgee	Human / Mouse (ortholog); Top expressed in: jejunal mucosa; gingival epithelium; mucosa of sigmoid colon; skin of thigh; palpebral conjunctiva; skin of hip; bronchial epithelial cell; duodenum; mucosa of ileum; epithelium of nasopharynx / Top expressed in: epithelium of stomach; left colon; transitional epithelium of urinary bladder; epithelium of small intestine; stria vascularis; migratory enteric neural crest cell; mucous cell of stomach; submandibular gland; pyloric antrum; left lung lobe; More reference expression data
BioGPS	More reference expression data
Gene ontology
Molecular function	calcium ion binding; protein binding; ankyrin binding; gamma-catenin binding; beta-catenin binding; GTPase activating protein binding; metal ion binding; cell adhesion molecule binding; cadherin binding; identical protein binding; cytoskeletal protein binding; protein homodimerization activity
Cellular component	apical junction complex; trans-Golgi network; extracellular region; perinuclear region of cytoplasm; cortical actin cytoskeleton; Golgi apparatus; lamellipodium; cytoplasmic side of plasma membrane; endosome; lateral plasma membrane; catenin complex; actin cytoskeleton; flotillin complex; membrane; extracellular exosome; integral component of membrane; cell junction; cytoplasm; plasma membrane; cell surface; postsynapse; glutamatergic synapse
Biological process	negative regulation of cell-cell adhesion; positive regulation of transcription, DNA-templated; cellular response to lithium ion; cell adhesion; extracellular matrix organization; cellular response to indole-3-methanol; extracellular matrix disassembly; synapse assembly; pituitary gland development; response to toxic substance; response to organic substance; neuron projection development; adherens junction organization; homophilic cell adhesion via plasma membrane adhesion molecules; entry of bacterium into host cell; protein localization to plasma membrane; cell-cell adhesion; cell morphogenesis; cell-cell junction assembly; regulation of gene expression; calcium-dependent cell-cell adhesion via plasma membrane cell adhesion molecules; negative regulation of cell migration; positive regulation of protein import into nucleus; cell-cell adhesion mediated by cadherin; regulation of protein catabolic process at postsynapse, modulating synaptic transmission
Sources:Amigo / QuickGO
Orthologs
Databases	NCBI: entry; OMA: entry
Species	Human	Mouse
Entrez	999	12550
Ensembl	ENSG00000039068	ENSMUSG00000000303
UniProt	P12830	P09803
RefSeq (mRNA)	NM_004360; NM_001317184; NM_001317185; NM_001317186	NM_009864
RefSeq (protein)	NP_001304113; NP_001304114; NP_001304115; NP_004351	NP_033994
Location (UCSC)	Chr 16: 68.74 – 68.84 Mb	Chr 8: 107.33 – 107.4 Mb
PubMed search
- Wikidata
View/Edit Human	View/Edit Mouse

Cadherin-1 or Epithelial cadherin (E-cadherin), is a protein that in humans is encoded by the CDH1 gene (not to be confused with the APC/C activator protein CDH1). Mutations are correlated with gastric, breast, colorectal, thyroid, and ovarian cancers. CDH1 has also been designated as CD324 (cluster of differentiation 324). It is a tumor suppressor gene.

== History ==
The discovery of cadherin cell-cell adhesion proteins is attributed to Masatoshi Takeichi, whose experience with adhering epithelial cells began in 1966. His work originally began by studying lens differentiation in chicken embryos at Nagoya University, where he explored how retinal cells regulate lens fiber differentiation. To do this, Takeichi initially collected media that had previously cultured neural retina cells (CM) and suspended lens epithelial cells in it. He observed that cells suspended in the CM media had delayed attachment compared to cells in his regular medium. His interest in cell adherence was sparked, and he moved on to examine attachment in other conditions such as in the presence of protein, magnesium, and calcium. At this point in 1970s, little was understood about the specific roles these ions played. Therefore, Takeichi's work in discovering calcium's role in cell-cell adhesion was highly transformative.

Takeichi went on to discover the existence of multiple cadherins, beginning with E-cadherin. Using rats immunized with F9 cells, he worked with an undergraduate student in the Okada laboratory, Noboru Suzuki, to generate mouse antibodies called ECCD1. This antibody blocked cell-adhesion ability and showed a calcium-dependent interaction with its antigen, E-cadherin. They went on to find that ECCD1 reacted to a variety of epithelial cells when comparing antibody distributions. The delay Takeichi experienced in specifically discovering E-cadherin was most likely due to the model he used to initially investigate cell adherence. The chinese hamster V79 cells apparently did not express E-cadherin, but instead 20 other subtypes that have since been discovered.

== Function ==
Cadherin-1 is a classical member of the cadherin superfamily. The encoded protein is a calcium-dependent cell–cell adhesion glycoprotein composed of five extracellular cadherin repeats, a transmembrane region, and a highly conserved cytoplasmic tail. Mutations in this gene are correlated with gastric, breast, colorectal, thyroid, and ovarian cancers. Loss of function is thought to contribute to progression in cancer by increasing proliferation, invasion, and/or metastasis. The ectodomain of this protein mediates bacterial adhesion to mammalian cells, and the cytoplasmic domain is required for internalization. Identified transcript variants arise from mutation at consensus splice sites.

E-cadherin (epithelial) is the most well-studied member of the cadherin family and is an essential transmembrane protein within adherens junctions. In addition to E-cadherin, adherens junctions are composed of the intracellular components, p120-catenin, beta-catenin, and alpha-catenin. Together, these proteins stabilize epithelial tissues and regulate intercellular exchange. The structure of E-cadherin consists of 5 cadherin repeats (EC1 ~ EC5) in the extracellular domain, one transmembrane domain, and a highly-phosphorylated intracellular domain. This region is vital to beta-catenin binding and, therefore, to E-cadherin function. Beta-catenin can also bind to alpha-catenin. Alpha-catenin participates in regulation of actin-containing cytoskeletal filaments. In epithelial cells, E-cadherin-containing cell-to-cell junctions are often adjacent to actin-containing filaments of the cytoskeleton.

E-cadherin is first expressed in the 2-cell stage of mammalian development, and becomes phosphorylated by the 8-cell stage, where it causes compaction. In adult tissues, E-cadherin is expressed in epithelial tissues, where it is constantly regenerated with a 5-hour half-life on the cell surface. Cell–cell interactions mediated by E-cadherin are crucial to blastula formation in many animals.

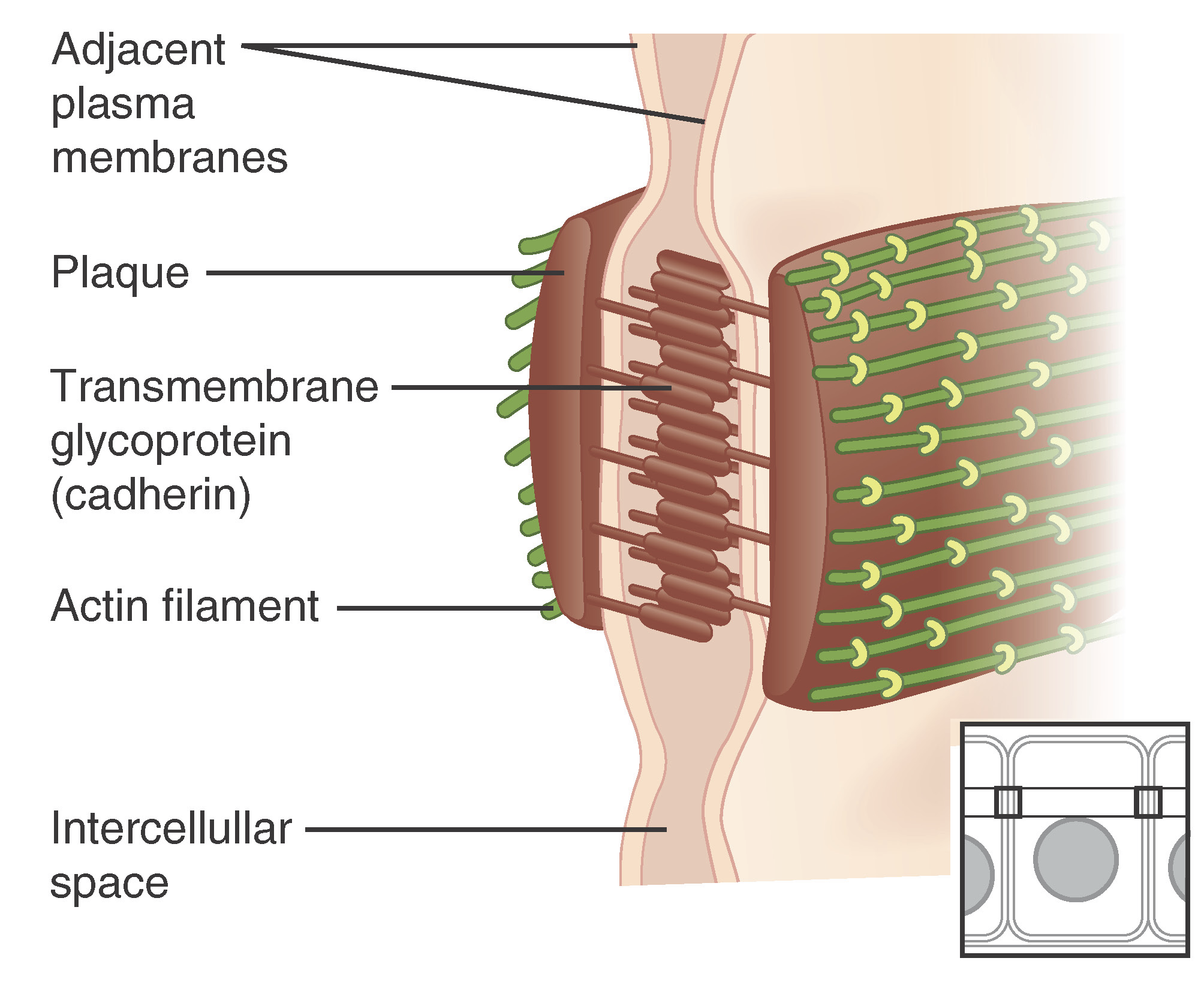
Neighboring epithelial cells can transduce mechanical information via E-cadherin interactions, here depicted as a generic cadherin, Actin filaments are associated with several adherens complex proteins, such as α-catenin and vinculin. The activity of these proteins and E-cadherin allows for tensile stimulus to be exerted one from actomyosin system to another, permitting tissue coordination.

=== Cell cycle ===
E-cadherin has been known to mediate adhesion-dependent proliferation inhibition by triggering cell cycle exit via contact inhibition of proliferation (CIP) and recruitment of the Hippo pathway. E-cadherin adhesions inhibit growth signals, which initiates a kinase cascade that excludes the transcription factor YAP from the nucleus. Conversely, decreasing cell density (decreasing cell-cell adhesion) or applying mechanical stretch to place E-cadherins under increased tension promotes cell cycle entry and YAP nuclear localization.

=== Cell sorting during epithelial budding ===
E-cadherin has been found to have a role in epithelial morphogenesis and branching, such as during the formation of epithelial buds. Physiologically, branching is an important feature that allows tissues, such as salivary glands and pancreatic buds, to maximize functional surface areas. It has been discovered that the application of appropriate growth factors and extracellular matrix can induce branching in tissue, but the mechanisms of branching appear to differ between single-layered and stratified epithelium.

Single-layered branching occurs as nearby mechanical influences, such as airway smooth muscle cells, cause epithelial sheets buckle. Stratified epithelial cannot respond to stimulus in the same way due to the absence of internal space (i.e. lumen) that allows tissue sheet flexibility. Instead, it appears stratified epithelial buds are generated by the clefting of one original epithelial cell cluster. Investigations in salivary glands revealed that buds expand as new cells are uniformly distributed across the peripheral surface. Surface-derived cells continue to replicate and produce daughter cells, which then move from the interior back to the surface. This movement is maintained by an E-cadherin gradient, in which surface cells have low levels of E-cadherin and interior cells have high levels of E-cadherin. Such a system allows for increased interactions between interior cells, limiting mobility and ensuring they remain more static, while likewise ensuring the surface cells are comparatively less hindered. This gives a fluidity to their movement within the stratified epithelia, until they begin to accumulate at the edges of the forming bud.

While this gradient is important for cell sorting within the tissue layers, additional experiments show that the physical generation of buds is dependent on cell-matrix interactions^{[13]}. As low-E-cadherin cells accumulate at the surface, they tightly adhere to the basement membrane, allowing the epithelia to cleft and bud as the surface area expands and folds. If the structure of the basement membrane is disrupted, such as by collagenase, the low-E-cadherin cells no longer have a barrier to interact with. Surface-derived daughter cells fail to remain at the periphery to initiate budding under these conditions, yet budding can be reestablished with basement membrane restoration.

=== Cell sorting during gastrulation ===
The adhesive qualities of E-cadherin indicate it could be a relevant player within germ-layer organization during gastrulation. Gastrulation is a fundamental phase of vertebrate development in which three primary germ layers are defined, ectoderm, mesoderm, and endoderm. Cell adhesion has been linked to progenitor sorting, where ectoderm was found to be the least cohesive and mesoderm was comparable to endoderm cohesion. Initial work depleting calcium from media and, more strikingly, the impairment of E-cadherin both greatly impaired primary germ layer cohesion. As cohesive properties of progenitors were further examined, higher concentrations of CDH-1 were found on mesoderm or endoderm than on ectoderm. While adhesion is a factor in gastrulation, the driving factor in cell sorting was instead found to be in cell-cortex tension^{[15]}. Disrupting the actomyosin-dependent cell cortex with actin depolymerizers and myosin-II inhibitors interrupted impeded tension balances and was sufficient to inhibit cell sorting. This is likely because cell sorting is driven by energy minimization. Within tissue energetics, tension plays an important role in ensuring: (1) lower surface tension surrounds the higher surface tension germ layers; (2) aggregate surface tension is appropriately increased; and (3) tension is higher at the cell-to-medium interface than cell-to-cell interface[8]. Cellular adhesion must still be considered for a complete understanding of progenitor sorting, as it directly diminishes the energetic effects of tension. Combined, tension and adhesion increase aggregate surface tension, which allows for unique interactions between differing germ layers and appropriate cell sorting.

=== Cell migration ===
Cell migration is vital for constructing and maintaining multicellular organization. Morphogenesis involves numerous events of cell migration, such as the migration of epithelial sheets in gastrulation, the neural crest cell migration, or posterior lateral line primordium migration. It is known that cells that begin to internalize at the dorsal surface of the embryo mobilize to extend the axis and direct posterior prechordal plate and notochord precursors. How cells are able to orient themselves during this process is dependent on the protrusions of "follower cells" to guide the leading cells in the appropriate direction.

E-cadherin has an active role in collective cell dynamics, such as by directing the migration of mesendoderm towards the animal pole. It has been demonstrated that the genetic knockdown of E-cadherin results in random orientations of the cellular protrusions, resulting in cellular migration that is random and no longer unified. Knockdowns in leading and following cell groups both resulted in a loss of orientation, which could be rescued by re-expressing E-cadherin. The information E-cadherin transmitted from cell to cell was directional information inherent to cytoskeletal tension. Restoring only the external adhesion capability of E-cadherin was not enough to rescue protrusion orientation during knockdown experiments. The intracellular domain of E-cadherin is essential due to its mechanotransduction characteristics; it interacts with alpha-catenin and vinculin and altogether allows for the mechanosensation of tension. The exact mechanism on how mechanosensation directs actin-rich protrusions is yet to be elucidated, however initial investigations suggest regulation of PI3K activity is involved.

==== Force transduction by E-cadherin ====
Adherens junctions (AJs) form homotypic dimers between neighboring cells, where the intracellular protein complex interacts with the actomyosin cytoskeleton. p120-catenin controls E-cadherin membrane localization, while β-catenin and α-catenin provide the link that connect AJs to the cytoskeleton. If AJs experience tensile force when β-catenin is bound, the interaction, known as a catch bond interaction, between α-catenin and F-actin is reinforced. This exposes the a previously inaccessible actin binding site within α-catenin. The binding of vinculin to α-catenin offers the protein complex another linkage with actin in addition to recruiting proteins such as Mena/VASP.

Coordination of the actomyosin network between neighboring cells permits collective cellular activity, such as contractility during morphogenesis. This network is better equipped to maintain tissue integrity if under intercellular stress, but should not be considered a static system. E-cadherin is involved in cellular responses and transcriptional activators that impact migration, growth, and reorganization.

==== Mechanism of action ====
E-cadherin interacts with its environment through numerous pathways. One mechanism that it is involved in is the migration of tissue sheets via cryptic lamellipodia. Rac1 and its effectors act at the front edge of this structure to initiate actin polymerization, allowing the cell to generate force at the cellular margin and forward movement. As leader cells extend their lamellipodia, followers also extend protrusions to collect information on where the tissue sheet it moving. Cell migration is dependent on the generation of a polarized state, with Rac1 at the front and Rho-mediated adhesion at the rear. The release of Merlin from cell contacts partially mediates concomitant migration by acting as a mechanochemical transducer. This tumour suppressor protein relocalizes from cortical cell-cell junctions to the cytoplasm during migration to coordinate Rac1 activation. Other pathways can then modulate Merlin activity, such as circumferential actin belts, which suppresses the nuclear export of Merlin and its interaction with E-cadherin.

== Interactions ==
CDH1 (gene) has been shown to interact with

- CBLL1,
- CDC27,
- CDH3,
- C-Met,
- CTNND1,
- CTNNB1,
- CTNNA1
- FOXM1,
- HDAC1,
- HDAC2,
- IQGAP1,
- FYN,
- NEDD9,
- Plakoglobin,
- Vinculin,
- PTPmu(PTPRM)
- PTPrho(PTPRT)

== Clinical significance ==
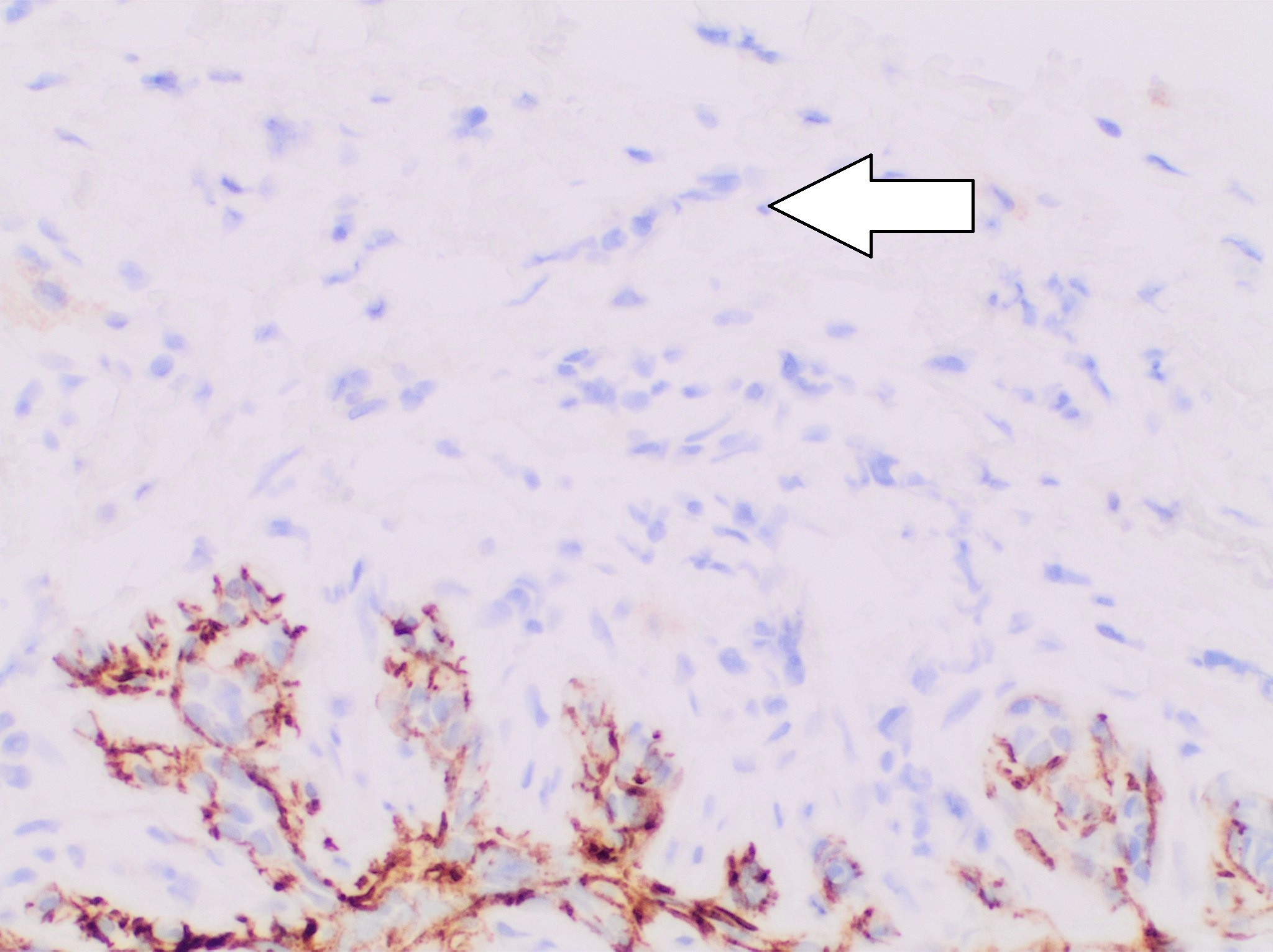
Immunohistochemistry for E-cadherin in invasive lobular carcinoma, showing loss of expression in invasive tumor cells (white arrow).

Loss of E-cadherin function or expression has been implicated in cancer progression and metastasis. E-cadherin downregulation decreases the strength of cellular adhesion within a tissue, resulting in an increase in cellular motility. This in turn may allow cancer cells to cross the basement membrane and invade surrounding tissues. E-cadherin is also used by pathologists to diagnose different kinds of breast cancer. When compared with invasive ductal carcinoma, E-cadherin expression is markedly reduced or absent in the great majority of invasive lobular carcinomas when studied by immunohistochemistry. E-cadherin and N-cadherin temporal-spatial expression are tightly regulated during cranial suture fusion in craniofacial development.

== Cancer ==
=== Metastasis ===
Transitions between epithelial and mesenchymal states play important roles in embryonic development and cancer metastasis. E-cadherin level changes in EMT (epithelial-mesenchymal transition) and MET (mesenchymal-epithelial transition). E-cadherin acts as an invasion suppressor and a classical tumor suppressor gene in pre-invasive lobular breast carcinoma.

=== EMT ===
E-cadherin is a crucial type of cell–cell adhesion to hold the epithelial cells tight together. E-cadherin can sequester β-catenin on the cell membrane by the cytoplasmic tail of E-cadherin. Loss of E-cadherin expression results in releasing β-catenin into the cytoplasm. Liberated β-catenin molecules may migrate into the nucleus and trigger the expression of EMT-inducing transcription factors. Together with other mechanisms, such as constitutive RTK activation, E-cadherin loss can lead cancer cells to the mesenchymal state and undergo metastasis. E-cadherin is an important switch in EMT.

=== MET ===
The mesenchymal state cancer cells migrate to new sites and may undergo METs in certain favorable microenvironment. For example, the cancer cells can recognize differentiated epithelial cell features in the new sites and upregulate E-cadherin expression. Those cancer cells can form cell–cell adhesions again and return to an epithelial state.

=== Examples ===
- Inherited inactivating mutations in CDH1 are associated with hereditary diffuse gastric cancer. Individuals with this condition have up to a 70% lifetime risk of developing diffuse gastric carcinoma, and females with CDH1 mutations have up to a 60% lifetime risk of developing lobular breast cancer.
- Inactivation of CDH1 (accompanied with loss of the wild-type allele) in 56% of lobular breast carcinomas.
- Inactivation of CDH1 in 50% of diffuse gastric carcinomas.
- Complete loss of E-cadherin protein expression in 84% of lobular breast carcinomas.

=== Genetic and epigenetic control ===
Several proteins such as SNAI1, ZEB2, SNAI2, TWIST1 and ZEB1 have been found to downregulate E-cadherin expression. When expression of those transcription factors is altered, transcriptional repressors of E-cadherin were overexpressed in tumor cells. Another group of genes, such as AML1, p300 and HNF3, can upregulate the expression of E-cadherin.

In order to study the epigenetic regulation of E-cadherin, M Lombaerts et al. performed a genome wide expression study on 27 human mammary cell lines. Their results revealed two main clusters that have the fibroblastic or epithelial phenotype, respectively. In close examination, the clusters showing fibroblast phenotypes only have either partial or complete CDH1 promoter methylation, while the clusters with epithelial phenotypes have both wild-type cell lines and cell lines with mutant CDH1 status. The authors also found that EMT can happen in breast cancer cell lines with hypermethylation of CDH1 promoter, but in breast cancer cell lines with a CDH1 mutational inactivation EMT cannot happen. It contradicts the hypothesis that E-cadherin loss is the initial or primary cause for EMT. In conclusion, the results suggest that "E-cadherin transcriptional inactivation is an epi-phenomenon and part of an entire program, with much more severe effects than loss of E-cadherin expression alone".

Other studies also show that epigenetic regulation of E-cadherin expression occurs during metastasis. The methylation patterns of the E-cadherin 5' CpG island are not stable. During metastatic progression of many cases of epithelial tumors, a transient loss of E-cadherin is seen and the heterogeneous loss of E-cadherin expression results from a heterogeneous pattern of promoter region methylation of E-cadherin.

== See also ==
- Hereditary lobular breast cancer
- Cluster of differentiation
