= CBLL1 =

Protein-coding gene in humans

Identifiers
- Aliases: CBLL1, HAKAI, RNF188, Cbl proto-oncogene like 1
- External IDs: OMIM: 606872; MGI: 2144842; GeneCards: CBLL1
Available structures
PDB	Ortholog search: PDBe RCSB
PDB	List of PDB id codes 2MQ1, 3VK6
Enzyme activity
EC #	BRENDA	ExPASy	KEGG	MetaCyc
2.3.2.27	↗	↗	↗	↗

Gene location (Human)
Chr.	Chromosome 7 (human)
Band	7q22.3	Start	107,743,949 bp
Band	7q22.3	End	107,761,667 bp

Gene location (Mouse)
Chr.	Chromosome 12 (mouse)
Band	12|12 A2	Start	31,534,828 bp
Band	12|12 A2	End	31,549,615 bp
RNA expression pattern
Bgee	Human / Mouse (ortholog); Top expressed in: Achilles tendon; epithelium of colon; muscle of thigh; endothelial cell; bone marrow; germinal epithelium; bone marrow cell; oocyte; gastrocnemius muscle; gonad / Top expressed in: Rostral migratory stream; genital tubercle; tail of embryo; retinal pigment epithelium; trigeminal ganglion; zygote; secondary oocyte; lacrimal gland; ciliary body; lateral septal nucleus; More reference expression data
BioGPS	n/a
Gene ontology
Molecular function	protein binding; metal ion binding; ubiquitin protein ligase activity; identical protein binding; ubiquitin-protein transferase activity; transferase activity; zinc ion binding
Cellular component	ubiquitin ligase complex; nucleus; nucleoplasm; cytosol; nuclear speck; cytoplasm; RNA N6-methyladenosine methyltransferase complex
Biological process	positive regulation of cell migration; negative regulation of cell adhesion; positive regulation of endocytosis; regulation of cell adhesion; protein ubiquitination; entry of bacterium into host cell; cell-cell adhesion; mRNA methylation; multicellular organism development
Sources:Amigo / QuickGO
Orthologs
Databases	NCBI: entry; OMA: entry
Species	Human	Mouse
Entrez	79872	104836
Ensembl	ENSG00000105879	ENSMUSG00000020659
UniProt	Q75N03	Q9JIY2
RefSeq (mRNA)	NM_001284291; NM_024814	NM_001253847; NM_001253848; NM_134048
RefSeq (protein)	NP_001271220; NP_079090	NP_001240776; NP_001240777; NP_598809
Location (UCSC)	Chr 7: 107.74 – 107.76 Mb	Chr 12: 31.53 – 31.55 Mb
PubMed search
- Wikidata
View/Edit Human	View/Edit Mouse

The E3 ubiquitin-protein ligase Hakai (HAKAI) also known as Casitas B-lineage lymphoma-transforming sequence-like protein 1 (CBLL1) is an enzyme that in humans is encoded by the CBLL1 gene. This gene encodes an E3 ubiquitin ligase for the E-cadherin complex and mediates its ubiquitination, endocytosis, and degradation in the lysosomes. The encoded protein contains a RING-finger domain and is also thought to have a role in control of cell proliferation.

== Function ==
Hakai functions as a RING finger domain-containing E3 ubiquitin ligase for E-cadherin. Hakai mediates E-cadherin ubiquitination and its degradation by proteasomes. "Hakai" means "destruction" in Japanese. Proteosomal degradation of E-cadherin can be regulated by phosphorylation. The Hakai binding site is a part of the E-cadherin cytoplasmic domain that contains several tyrosines. Tyrosine kinases such as Src and Met can phosphorylate E-cadherin and enhance Hakai binding to E-cadherin. Two lysines of the E-cadherin cytoplasmic domain have been shown to be sites for ubiquitination. Hakai also interacts with polypyrimidine tract-binding protein-associated splicing factor.

== See also ==
- CBL (gene); the gene name "CBLL1" comes from "Cbl-like protein 1"
