= Catenin alpha-3 =

Protein found in humans

CTNNA3

Identifiers
- Aliases: CTNNA3, ARVD13, VR22, catenin alpha 3
- External IDs: OMIM: 607667; MGI: 2661445; GeneCards: CTNNA3

Gene location (Human)
Chr.	Chromosome 10 (human)
Band	10q21.3	Start	65,912,457 bp
Band	10q21.3	End	67,763,637 bp

Gene location (Mouse)
Chr.	Chromosome 10 (mouse)
Band	10|10 B4- B5.1	Start	63,265,877 bp
Band	10|10 B4- B5.1	End	64,839,446 bp
RNA expression pattern
Bgee	Human / Mouse (ortholog); Top expressed in: corpus callosum; right ventricle; internal globus pallidus; Skeletal muscle tissue of biceps brachii; inferior ganglion of vagus nerve; subthalamic nucleus; external globus pallidus; pars reticulata; endothelial cell; pons / Top expressed in: interventricular septum; seminiferous tubule; spermatid; lumbar subsegment of spinal cord; zygote; spermatocyte; muscle of thigh; primary oocyte; ventricle of the heart; left ventricle; More reference expression data
BioGPS	n/a
Gene ontology
Molecular function	actin filament binding; beta-catenin binding; protein binding; cadherin binding
Cellular component	cytoplasm; adherens junction; fascia adherens; cytoskeleton; lamellipodium
Biological process	cell adhesion; bundle of His cell-Purkinje myocyte adhesion involved in cell communication; regulation of heart rate by cardiac conduction; regulation of ventricular cardiac muscle cell action potential; cell-cell adhesion
Sources:Amigo / QuickGO
Orthologs
Databases	NCBI: entry; OMA: entry
Species	Human	Mouse
Entrez	29119	216033
Ensembl	ENSG00000183230	ENSMUSG00000060843
UniProt	Q9UI47; Q8WW10	Q65CL1
RefSeq (mRNA)	NM_001127384; NM_001291133; NM_013266	NM_001164376; NM_001164519; NM_177612
RefSeq (protein)	NP_001120856; NP_001278062; NP_037398; NP_001120856.1; NP_001278062.1	NP_001157848; NP_001157991; NP_808280
Location (UCSC)	Chr 10: 65.91 – 67.76 Mb	Chr 10: 63.27 – 64.84 Mb
PubMed search
- Wikidata
View/Edit Human	View/Edit Mouse

CTNNA3

Identifiers
- Symbol: CTNNA3
- Alt. names: VR22; ARVD13
- NCBI gene: 29119
- HGNC: 2511
- OMIM: 607667
- UniProt: Q9UI47

Other data
- Locus: Chr. 10 q21.3
- Wikidata: CTNNA3
Search for
- Structures: Swiss-model
- Domains: InterPro

Catenin alpha-3, also known as αT-catenin, is a α-catenin protein that in humans is encoded by the CTNNA3 gene.
