= Catenin alpha-2 =

Protein found in humans

CTNNA2

Identifiers
- Aliases: CTNNA2, CAP-R, CAPR, CT114, CTNR, catenin alpha 2, CDCBM9
- External IDs: OMIM: 114025; MGI: 88275; GeneCards: CTNNA2
Available structures
| PDB | Ortholog search: PDBe RCSB |
| PDB | List of PDB id codes 4K1O, 4ONS, 4P9T |

Gene location (Human)
| Chr. | Chromosome 2 (human) |
| Band | 2p12 | Start | 79,185,231 bp |
| Band | 2p12 | End | 80,648,861 bp |

Gene location (Mouse)
| Chr. | Chromosome 6 (mouse) |
| Band | 6 C3|6 33.54 cM | Start | 76,858,620 bp |
| Band | 6 C3|6 33.54 cM | End | 77,956,682 bp |
RNA expression pattern
| Bgee | Human / Mouse (ortholog); Top expressed in: frontal pole; Brodmann area 46; superior frontal gyrus; postcentral gyrus; lateral nuclear group of thalamus; Brodmann area 10; corpus epididymis; dorsolateral prefrontal cortex; orbitofrontal cortex; sperm / Top expressed in: ganglionic eminence; left lung; dermis; dentate gyrus of hippocampal formation granule cell; muscle of anterior abdominal wall; neural tube; superior frontal gyrus; lens; inferior colliculi; superior colliculus; More reference expression data |
| BioGPS | n/a |
Gene ontology
| Molecular function | structural molecule activity; actin filament binding; structural constituent of cytoskeleton; protein binding; cadherin binding; identical protein binding |
| Cellular component | cytoplasm; cytosol; cell projection; membrane; adherens junction; plasma membrane; axon; cell junction; basolateral plasma membrane; actin cytoskeleton; cytoskeleton; nucleus; lamellipodium; postsynaptic density; hippocampal mossy fiber to CA3 synapse; parallel fiber to Purkinje cell synapse; presynaptic active zone cytoplasmic component; extrinsic component of presynaptic membrane; extrinsic component of postsynaptic membrane; postsynaptic density, intracellular component |
| Biological process | cell differentiation; regulation of synapse structural plasticity; axonogenesis; dendrite morphogenesis; positive regulation of muscle cell differentiation; multicellular organism development; cell adhesion; radial glia guided migration of Purkinje cell; brain morphogenesis; prepulse inhibition; cytoskeleton organization; cell-cell adhesion; modification of postsynaptic actin cytoskeleton; regulation of neuron projection development; negative regulation of Arp2/3 complex-mediated actin nucleation; regulation of neuron migration |
Sources:Amigo / QuickGO
Orthologs
| Databases | NCBI: entry; OMA: entry |
| Species | Human | Mouse |
| Entrez | 1496 | 12386 |
| Ensembl | ENSG00000066032 | ENSMUSG00000063063 |
| UniProt | P26232 | Q61301 |
| RefSeq (mRNA) | NM_001164883; NM_001282597; NM_001282598; NM_001282599; NM_001282600 NM_004389; NM_001320810; NM_001399737 | NM_001109764; NM_009819; NM_145732; NM_001355193 |
| RefSeq (protein) | NP_001158355; NP_001269526; NP_001269527; NP_001269528; NP_001269529 NP_001307739; NP_004380 | NP_001103234; NP_033949; NP_663785; NP_001342122 |
| Location (UCSC) | Chr 2: 79.19 – 80.65 Mb | Chr 6: 76.86 – 77.96 Mb |
| PubMed search |
- Wikidata
| View/Edit Human | View/Edit Mouse |

Catenin alpha-2, also known as αN-catenin, is a type of α-catenin protein that in humans is encoded by the CTNNA2 gene.
