= Α-Catenin =

Primary protein link between cadherins and the actin cytoskeleton

catenin (cadherin-associated protein), alpha 1, 102kDa
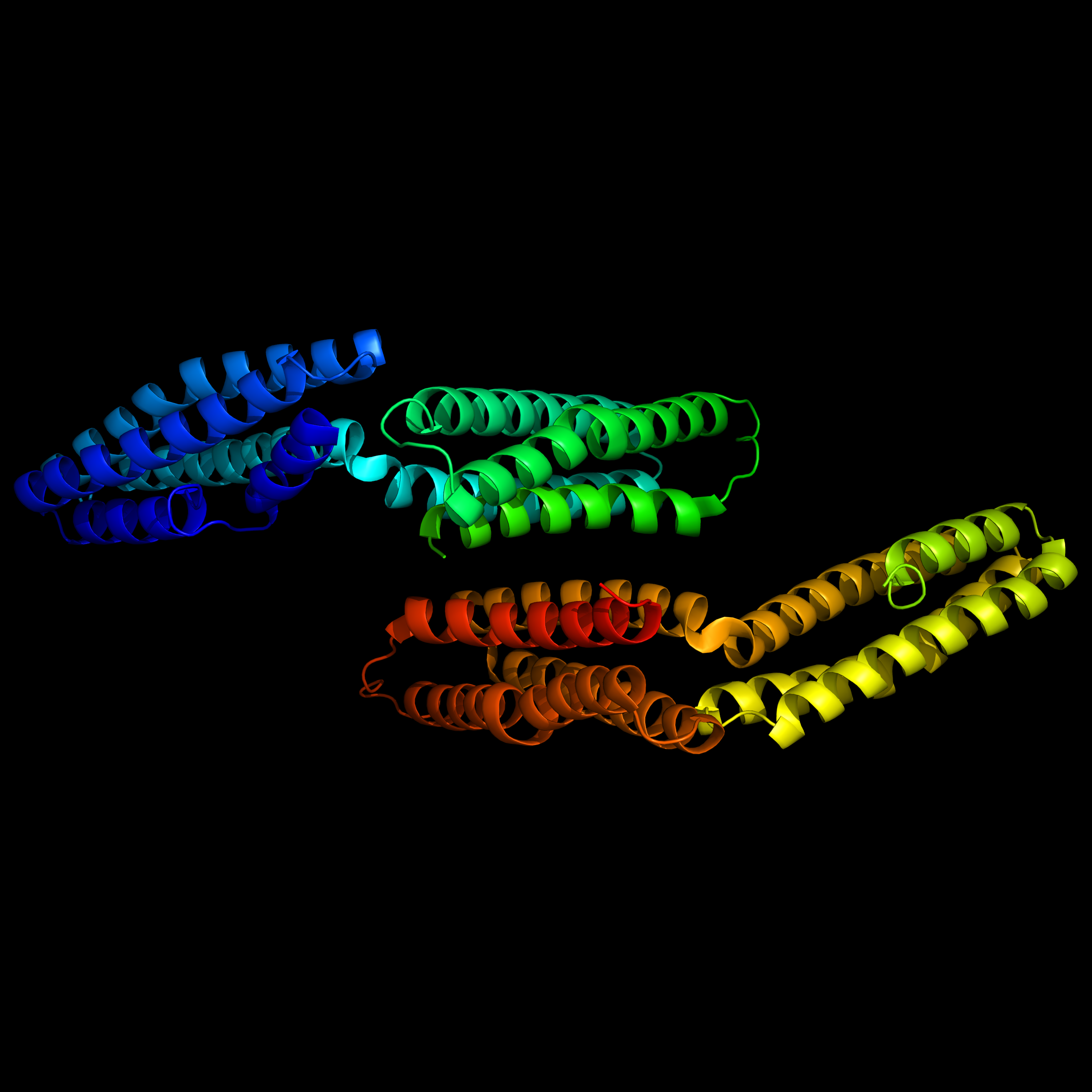
- Model of human aldehyde oxidase after PDB: 1H6G

Identifiers
- Symbol: CTNNA1
- NCBI gene: 1495
- HGNC: 2509
- OMIM: 116805
- RefSeq: NM_001903
- UniProt: P35221

Other data
- Locus: Chr. 5 q31.2
Search for
- Structures: Swiss-model
- Domains: InterPro

catenin (cadherin-associated protein), alpha 2

Identifiers
- Symbol: CTNNA2
- NCBI gene: 1496
- HGNC: 2510
- OMIM: 114025
- RefSeq: NM_004389
- UniProt: P26232

Other data
- Locus: Chr. 2 p12-p11.1
Search for
- Structures: Swiss-model
- Domains: InterPro

catenin (cadherin-associated protein), alpha 3

Identifiers
- Symbol: CTNNA3
- NCBI gene: 29119
- HGNC: 2511
- OMIM: 607667
- RefSeq: NM_013266
- UniProt: Q9UI47

Other data
- Locus: Chr. 10 q21
Search for
- Structures: Swiss-model
- Domains: InterPro

α-Catenin (alpha-catenin) functions as the primary protein link between cadherins and the actin cytoskeleton. It has been reported that the actin binding proteins vinculin and α-actinin can bind to alpha-catenin. It has been suggested that alpha-catenin does not bind with high affinity to both actin filaments and the E-cadherin-beta-catenin complex at the same time. It has been observed that when α-catenin is not in a molecular complex with β-catenin, it dimerizes and functions to regulate actin filament assembly, possibly by competing with Arp2/3 protein. However, a protein complex including a cadherin, actin, β-catenin and α-catenin has not been isolated.

The amino acid sequence of α-catenin has sequence similarity to that of vinculin.

== Types ==
Three α-catenin genes are expressed in humans:

- CTNNA1, alpha-1-catenin (also called alpha-E-catenin)
- CTNNA2, alpha-2-catenin (also called alpha-N-catenin)
- CTNNA3, alpha-3-catenin (also called alpha-T-catenin)

== History ==
In the 1980s, embryonic carcinoma cells were used to describe a 102kD glycoprotein that potentially interacted with E-cadherin and other cytoskeletal complexes.^{1-3} It would later be known that this protein was in fact α-catenin. Its direct relationship with cytoskeletal components was not reported until almost a decade later.^{4} From 1994-1996, the characterization of interaction domains between α-catenin, beta-catenin, and plakoglobin were defined.

In parallel, from the early 1990s to about 2010, α-catenin dysregulation was widely implicated in various cancers ranging from breast, esophageal, Laryngeal, Prostate, Thyroid, Lung, Pancreatic, bladder, and more.^{5} In lieu of this research, the data suggests that α-catenin plays a more profound role than just stabilizing adhesion-junctions and promoting cell-cell adhesion.

== Current understanding of α-catenin's structure and model ==
Simply put, in the cadherin-catenin complex, cadherin molecules are linked through beta-catenin to α-Catenin, which then binds to filamentous actin (F-actin). At the protein domain level, α-catenin has three domains, an N-terminal binding beta-catenin, a middle domain binding vinculin, and a C-terminal binding F-actin.^{6-8} The C-terminal domain of α-catenin has been reported to be able to bind F-actin either directly or indirectly potentially explaining the plethora of different type of junctions across cells types. ^{9} Le et al. quantified the stability of the mechanotransduction properties of the α‐catenin/β‐catenin complex and showed that it can be stable for hundreds of seconds, at physiological force ranges.^{10} Additionally, they showed that phosphorylation of the complex severely reduces this time by up to 10-fold.^{10}

Despite this canonical structure, there is also evidence of α-catenin being found in the cytosol dimerized with itself or bound with Beta-catenin. These data have further supported the notion that α-catenin has other functions outside of junctional complexes.^{11} Notably, residues 57-146 of α-catenin form the binding site of beta-catenin and due to their 1:1 heterodimer capabilities, studies speculate that this heterodimer competes with homodimerization of α-catenin.^{12}

To date, there are three α-catenins, in mammals, that have been described. αE-catenin primarily found in epithelium and the canonical catenin of the three, αN-catenin found in neural tissues, and αT-catenin found primarily in the heart.^{13}

== α-Catenin: Beyond cell adhesion ==
=== Modulation of actin and tissue organization ===
As a homodimer, α-catenin, binds directly to F-actin.^{14} Wood et al. show that a chemical induction of homodimerization α-catenin reproduces in vitro its recruitment to the cell periphery.^{15} They expand further on this notion by showing that this recruitment promotes protrusion of filopodia and accumulates actin at the edges.^{15} This interaction is largely mediated by phosphatidylinositol 3-kinase and overall promotes cell adhesion and orientation.^{15}

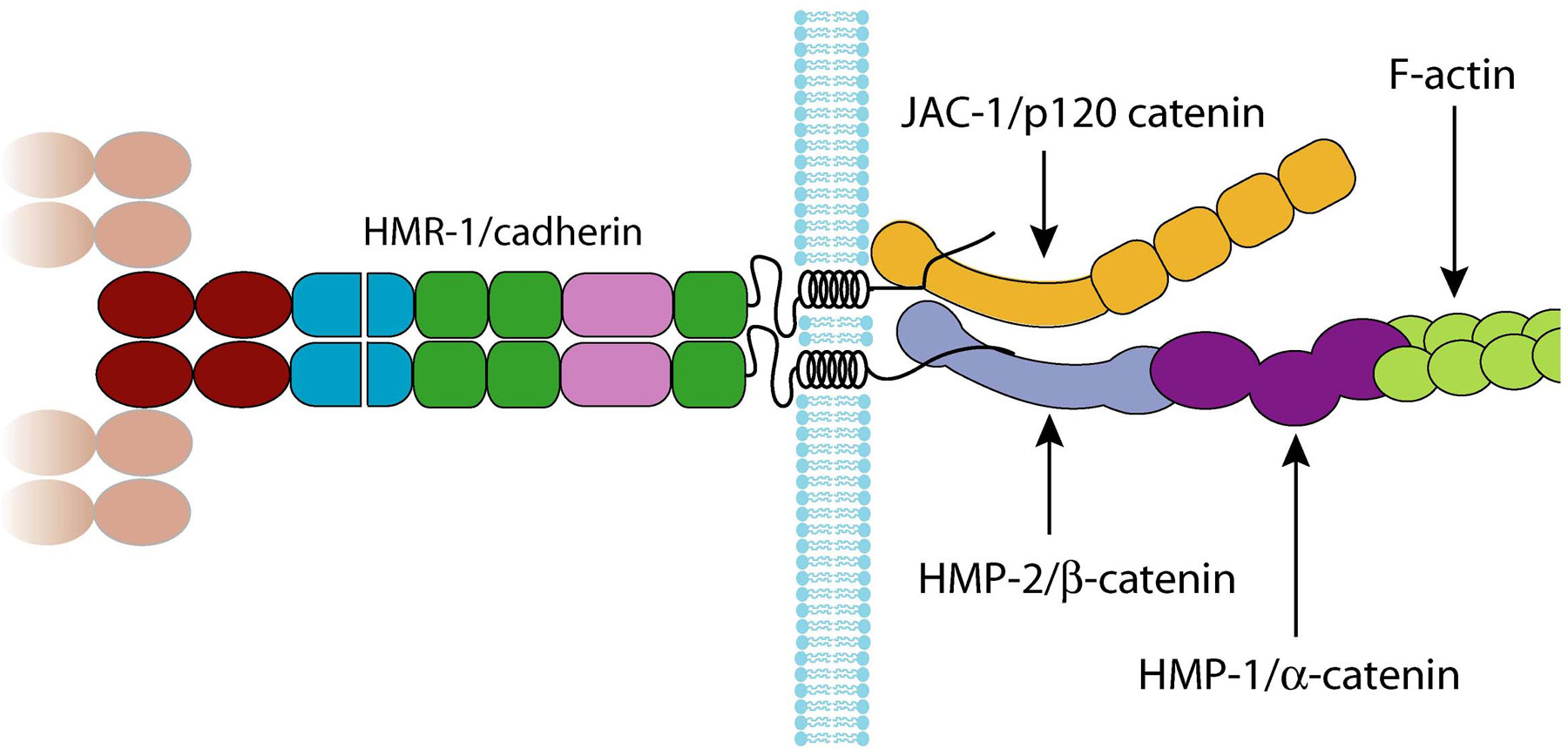
Cartoon of the Cadherin-Catenin Complex

Other studies show that α-catenin can interact with many different actin-binding proteins (α-actinin, ZO-1, afadin) to remodel cytoskeletal structure. This catenin has also been shown to negatively regulate actin polymerization, promote actin bundling, influence filopodia and lamellipodia properties, and control collective cell migration via tensile and traction forces. ^{16-18}

Along the same vein, a study found that in vascular endothelial cells, the fusion of VE-cadherin to α-catenin enhances its interaction with F-actin and this leads to a stronger endothelial barrier blocking inflammatory processes.^{19} Duong et al. expanded on these findings by reporting that the α1-helix of the actin-binding domain (ABD), exposed in this chimeric fusion protein, is responsible for stabilizing the adherence junctions and creating a stronger bond with actin.^{20} More importantly the discovered that this epitope is exposed in normal α-catenin when there is thrombin activity hence the constitutive reinforced binding to actin can be found in nonchimeric α-catenin and may play a role in other cell types.^{20}

=== First insights into extra-junctional roles ===
In 2001, Vasioukhen et al. targeted the ablation of α-catenin in mouse embryonic skin and reported that although cell adhesion was present, the epithelium exhibited a phenotypic mass of hyperproliferative epithelia that was reminiscent of squamous cell carcinoma. ^{21} Follow up studies, years later, showed that epithelia that lacked α-catenin had a deficiency in the basement membrane that led to invasion of the epithelium that also resembled invasive squamous cell carcinoma. ^{22}

=== Cell Migration ===
Some of the mechanisms by which RhoGEF on endosomes interact with α-catenin to establish cell polarity and migration have been elucidate via biosensors and depletion assays.^{23} Vassilev et al. have described the regulation of cell migration by a pathway found on endosomes that is driven in part by α-catenin. This directionality is done so via the restriction of RhoA perinuclearly and modulating Myosin-IIB at these sites.^{23} Another group found that by depleting N-cadherin and α-catenin, they could disrupt the patterns of migration in mouse enteric neural crest cells in both a collective and independent cell context.^{24}

=== Implications in cell signaling ===
The work of Vasioukhen and Fuchs also showed that epidermal cells with ablated αE-catenin had increased responsiveness to insulin receptor signaling and elevation of Ras and MAPK signaling as well. ^{21, 22} In the central nervous system, the ablation of αE-catenin resulted in brain hyperplasia and discovery of an upregulation in sonic hedgehog (shh) signaling. ^{25}

It was found that αE-catenin also played a role in the Hippo pathway as a tumor suppressor by inhibiting the nuclear translocation of YAP1.^{26} This group found that by deleting αE-catenin in the stem cell niche of the skin, there was an accumulation os SOX 9+ progenitors that hyper proliferate resulting in early onset of squamous cell carcinoma. This entire process was attributed to YAP signaling and the Hippo Pathway.^{26} Recent research by Pavel et al. describe α-catenin’s involvement in a feedback look mechanism of autophagy negatively regulating the levels of α-catenin, LC3-interacting proteins inhibiting the YAP/TAZ oncogenes, resulting in upregulating of autophagy. ^{27}They further report that this feedback loop maybe tissue context specific as it negatively regulates epithelial cell proliferation in the skin while positively affects those in the liver. ^{27}

In the pancreas, Cailiani et al. found that the deletion of αE-catenin in pancreatic progenitors lead to deficient cell aggregation, constitutive activation of the sonic hedgehog pathway, and reduction in endocrine cell differentiation which resulted in the accumulation of sox9+ progenitors. ^{28}

=== Transcriptional Modulation ===
α-catenin’s role in transcriptional modulation has been elucidated by multiple studies implicating its association with the T-cell family (Tcf) of transcription factors. In colon cancer cell nuclei, α-catenin was found to accumulate and repress Tcf-dependent transcription.^{29} Another study reports its accumulation in the nucleus, with beta-catenin, and functioning as a repressor of the WNT pathway. ^{30} In parallel, choi et al., found a different mechanism by which α-catenin binds beta-catenin to TCF/LEF family DNA-binding proteins and recruits APC into a histone complex to regulate transcription of Wnt target genes. ^{31}

== Function in development across species ==
α-catenin is considered a conserved protein across eukaryotes. In Drosophila, a mutation in α-catenin disrupts the beta-catenin homologue, armadillo, from binding to it ultimately leading to dysregulation of cell adhesion.^{32} In nematodes, C. elegans to be specific, homologues of α-catenin, beta-catenin, and cadherins (HMR-1, HMP-1, HMP-2 respectively) have been reported to form adhesion junctions. ^{33}

== Evolutionary aspects of α-catenin ==
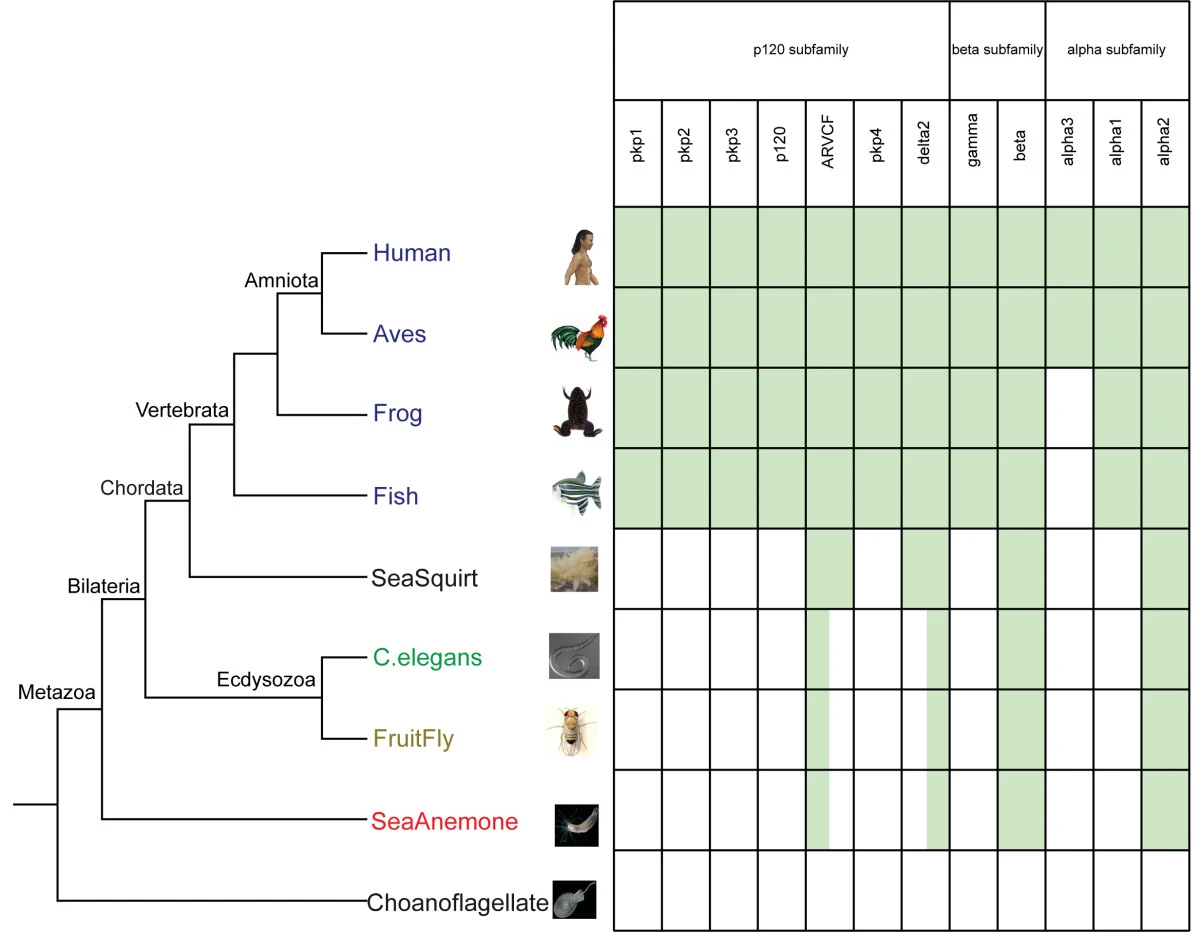
Shows the evolutionary tree from metazoan with the presence of cadherins and catenins in each phylum

Dictyostelium discoideum, a slime mold, has been shown to have both beta-catenin and α-catenin homologues named Aardvark and Ddα-catenin respectively.^{34} Additionally, they display similar interactions of binding with each other as has been observed in eukaryotes. However, their functionality seemed to be geared more towards maintaining cell polarity rather than cell adhesion.^{34} Dickinson et al. further report that because this metazoan lacks cadherins, and the catenin homologues function to preserve cell polarity, it is likely that catenins evolved independently from cadherins.^{34}

== See also ==
- Catenin
- Catenin beta-1

== References for History Onwards ==
1. Vestweber D, Kemler R. Rabbit antiserum against a purified surface glycoprotein decompacts mouse preimplantation embryos and reacts with specific adult tissues. Exp Cell Res. 1984;152(1):169-78.

2. Vestweber D, Kemler R. Some structural and functional aspects of the cell adhesion molecule uvomorulin. Cell Differ. 1984;15(2-4):269-73.

3. Kemler R, Ozawa M. Uvomorulin-catenin complex: cytoplasmic anchorage of a Ca2+-dependent cell adhesion molecule. Bioessays. 1989;11(4):88-91.

4. Rimm DL, Koslov ER, Kebriaei P, Cianci CD, Morrow JS. Alpha 1(E)-catenin is an actin-binding and -bundling protein mediating the attachment of F-actin to the membrane adhesion complex. Proc Natl Acad Sci U S A. 1995;92(19):8813-7.

5. Benjamin JM, Nelson WJ. Bench to bedside and back again: molecular mechanisms of alpha-catenin function and roles in tumorigenesis. Semin Cancer Biol. 2008;18(1):53-64.

6. Ishiyama N, Tanaka N, Abe K, Yang YJ, Abbas YM, Umitsu M, et al. An autoinhibited structure of alpha-catenin and its implications for vinculin recruitment to adherens junctions. J Biol Chem. 2013;288(22):15913-25.

7. Watabe-Uchida M, Uchida N, Imamura Y, Nagafuchi A, Fujimoto K, Uemura T, et al. alpha-Catenin-vinculin interaction functions to organize the apical junctional complex in epithelial cells. J Cell Biol. 1998;142(3):847-57.

8. Weiss EE, Kroemker M, Rudiger AH, Jockusch BM, Rudiger M. Vinculin is part of the cadherin-catenin junctional complex: complex formation between alpha-catenin and vinculin. J Cell Biol. 1998;141(3):755-64.

9. Takeichi M. Dynamic contacts: rearranging adherens junctions to drive epithelial remodelling. Nature Reviews Molecular Cell Biology. 2014;15(6):397-410.

10. Le S, Yu M, Yan J. Phosphorylation Reduces the Mechanical Stability of the alpha-Catenin/ beta-Catenin Complex. Angew Chem Int Ed Engl. 2019;58(51):18663-9.

11. Takeichi M. Multiple functions of α-catenin beyond cell adhesion regulation. Current Opinion in Cell Biology. 2018;54:24-9.

12. Pokutta S, Drees F, Yamada S, Nelson WJ, Weis WI. Biochemical and structural analysis of alpha-catenin in cell-cell contacts. Biochem Soc Trans. 2008;36(Pt 2):141-7.

13. Perez-Moreno M, Fuchs E. Catenins: keeping cells from getting their signals crossed. Dev Cell. 2006;11(5):601-12.

14. Drees F, Pokutta S, Yamada S, Nelson WJ, Weis WI. Alpha-catenin is a molecular switch that binds E-cadherin-beta-catenin and regulates actin-filament assembly. Cell. 2005;123(5):903-15.

15. Wood MN, Ishiyama N, Singaram I, Chung CM, Flozak AS, Yemelyanov A, et al. alpha-Catenin homodimers are recruited to phosphoinositide-activated membranes to promote adhesion. J Cell Biol. 2017;216(11):3767-83.

16. Boutillon A, Escot S, Elouin A, Jahn D, González-Tirado S, Starruß J, et al. Guidance by followers ensures long-range coordination of cell migration through α-catenin mechanoperception. Developmental Cell. 2022;57(12):1529-44.e5.

17. Kobielak A, Pasolli HA, Fuchs E. Mammalian formin-1 participates in adherens junctions and polymerization of linear actin cables. Nat Cell Biol. 2004;6(1):21-30.

18. Itoh M, Nagafuchi A, Moroi S, Tsukita S. Involvement of ZO-1 in cadherin-based cell adhesion through its direct binding to alpha catenin and actin filaments. J Cell Biol. 1997;138(1):181-92.

19. Schulte D, Kuppers V, Dartsch N, Broermann A, Li H, Zarbock A, et al. Stabilizing the VE-cadherin-catenin complex blocks leukocyte extravasation and vascular permeability. EMBO J. 2011;30(20):4157-70.

20. Duong CN, Bruckner R, Schmitt M, Nottebaum AF, Braun LJ, Meyer Zu Brickwedde M, et al. Force-induced changes of alpha-catenin conformation stabilize vascular junctions independently of vinculin. J Cell Sci. 2021;134(24).

21. Vasioukhin V, Bauer C, Degenstein L, Wise B, Fuchs E. Hyperproliferation and defects in epithelial polarity upon conditional ablation of alpha-catenin in skin. Cell. 2001;104(4):605-17.

22. Kobielak A, Fuchs E. Links between alpha-catenin, NF-kappaB, and squamous cell carcinoma in skin. Proc Natl Acad Sci U S A. 2006;103(7):2322-7.

23. Vassilev V, Platek A, Hiver S, Enomoto H, Takeichi M. Catenins Steer Cell Migration via Stabilization of Front-Rear Polarity. Dev Cell. 2017;43(4):463-79 e5.

24. Szabo A, Mayor R. Modelling collective cell migration of neural crest. Curr Opin Cell Biol. 2016;42:22-8.

25. Lien WH, Klezovitch O, Fernandez TE, Delrow J, Vasioukhin V. alphaE-catenin controls cerebral cortical size by regulating the hedgehog signaling pathway. Science. 2006;311(5767):1609-12.

26. Silvis MR, Kreger BT, Lien WH, Klezovitch O, Rudakova GM, Camargo FD, et al. alpha-catenin is a tumor suppressor that controls cell accumulation by regulating the localization and activity of the transcriptional coactivator Yap1. Sci Signal. 2011;4(174):ra33.

27. Pavel M, Park SJ, Frake RA, Son SM, Manni MM, Bento CF, et al. alpha-Catenin levels determine direction of YAP/TAZ response to autophagy perturbation. Nat Commun. 2021;12(1):1703.

28. Jimenez-Caliani AJ, Pillich R, Yang W, Diaferia GR, Meda P, Crisa L, et al. alphaE-Catenin Is a Positive Regulator of Pancreatic Islet Cell Lineage Differentiation. Cell Rep. 2017;20(6):1295-306.

29. Giannini AL, Vivanco M, Kypta RM. alpha-catenin inhibits beta-catenin signaling by preventing formation of a beta-catenin*T-cell factor*DNA complex. J Biol Chem. 2000;275(29):21883-8.

30. Daugherty RL, Serebryannyy L, Yemelyanov A, Flozak AS, Yu HJ, Kosak ST, et al. alpha-Catenin is an inhibitor of transcription. Proc Natl Acad Sci U S A. 2014;111(14):5260-5.

31. Choi SH, Estaras C, Moresco JJ, Yates JR, 3rd, Jones KA. alpha-Catenin interacts with APC to regulate beta-catenin proteolysis and transcriptional repression of Wnt target genes. Genes Dev. 2013;27(22):2473-88.

32. Orsulic S, Peifer M. An in vivo structure-function study of armadillo, the beta-catenin homologue, reveals both separate and overlapping regions of the protein required for cell adhesion and for wingless signaling. J Cell Biol. 1996;134(5):1283-300.

33. Simske JS, Koppen M, Sims P, Hodgkin J, Yonkof A, Hardin J. The cell junction protein VAB-9 regulates adhesion and epidermal morphology in C. elegans. Nat Cell Biol. 2003;5(7):619-25.

34. Dickinson DJ, Nelson WJ, Weis WI. A polarized epithelium organized by beta- and alpha-catenin predates cadherin and metazoan origins. Science. 2011;331(6022):1336-9.
