= Catenin alpha-1 =

Protein found in humans

CTNNA1
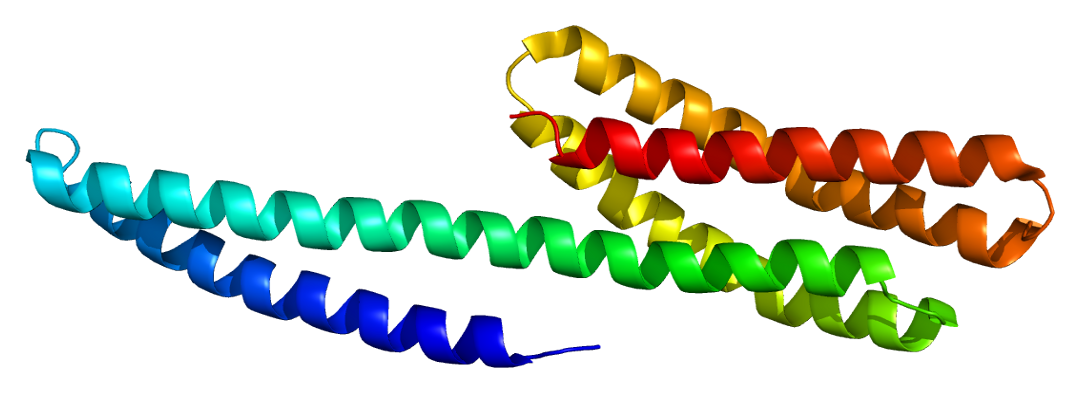

Identifiers
- Aliases: CTNNA1, CAP102, Catenin, MDPT2, catenin alpha 1
- External IDs: OMIM: 116805; MGI: 88274; GeneCards: CTNNA1
Available structures
PDB	Ortholog search: PDBe RCSB
PDB	List of PDB id codes 1H6G, 4EHP, 4IGG

Gene location (Human)
Chr.	Chromosome 5 (human)
Band	5q31.2	Start	138,610,967 bp
Band	5q31.2	End	138,935,034 bp

Gene location (Mouse)
Chr.	Chromosome 18 (mouse)
Band	18 B1|18 18.89 cM	Start	35,251,912 bp
Band	18 B1|18 18.89 cM	End	35,387,832 bp
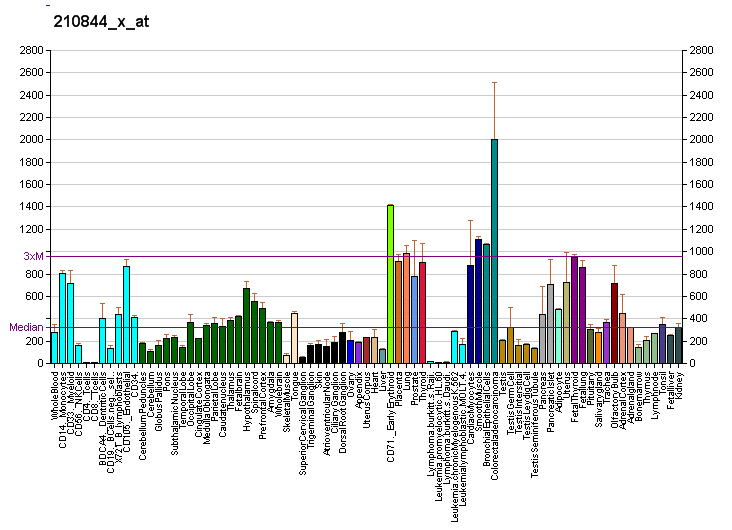

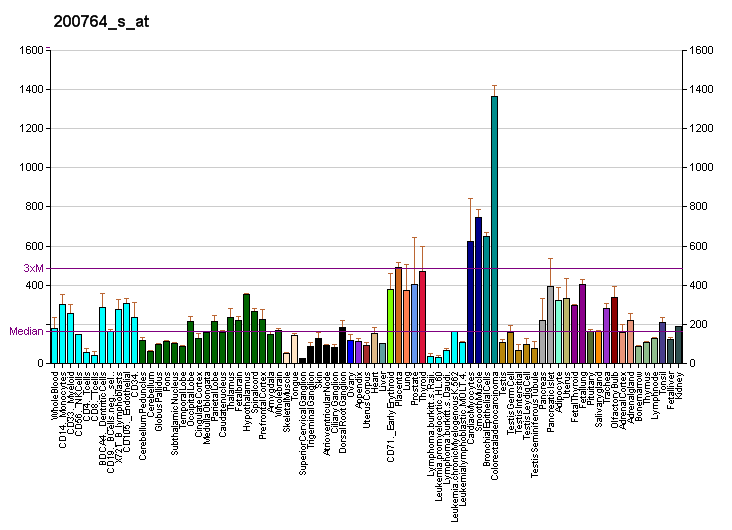

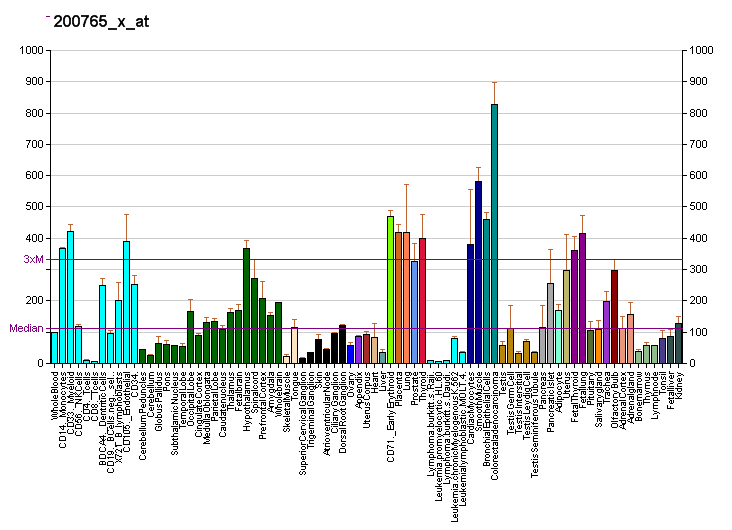
RNA expression pattern
Bgee	Human / Mouse (ortholog); Top expressed in: epithelium of colon; Achilles tendon; amniotic fluid; nasal epithelium; corpus callosum; tibial nerve; middle frontal gyrus; mucosa of pharynx; bronchial epithelial cell; ventricular zone / Top expressed in: medullary collecting duct; endothelial cell of lymphatic vessel; ciliary body; conjunctival fornix; retinal pigment epithelium; Paneth cell; Epithelium of choroid plexus; iris; left lung lobe; vestibular membrane of cochlear duct; More reference expression data
BioGPS	More reference expression data
Gene ontology
Molecular function	gamma-catenin binding; actin filament binding; beta-catenin binding; protein binding; vinculin binding; structural molecule activity; protein heterodimerization activity; RNA binding; cadherin binding; identical protein binding
Cellular component	acrosomal vesicle; cytoskeleton; intracellular membrane-bounded organelle; intercalated disc; actin cytoskeleton; adherens junction; catenin complex; cytosol; membrane; plasma membrane; cytoplasm; cell-cell junction; cell junction; lamellipodium; Golgi apparatus; focal adhesion; zonula adherens; flotillin complex
Biological process	positive regulation of smoothened signaling pathway; actin filament organization; response to estrogen; regulation of cell population proliferation; response to organic cyclic compound; negative regulation of extrinsic apoptotic signaling pathway in absence of ligand; negative regulation of neuroblast proliferation; establishment or maintenance of cell polarity; positive regulation of extrinsic apoptotic signaling pathway in absence of ligand; gap junction assembly; negative regulation of cell motility; negative regulation of integrin-mediated signaling pathway; apical junction assembly; cell adhesion; ageing; male gonad development; protein heterooligomerization; adherens junction organization; positive regulation of muscle cell differentiation; ovarian follicle development; odontogenesis of dentin-containing tooth; cellular response to indole-3-methanol; negative regulation of apoptotic process; axon regeneration; epithelial cell-cell adhesion
Sources:Amigo / QuickGO
Orthologs
Databases	NCBI: entry; OMA: entry
Species	Human	Mouse
Entrez	1495	12385
Ensembl	ENSG00000044115	ENSMUSG00000037815
UniProt	P35221	P26231
RefSeq (mRNA)	NM_001290307; NM_001290309; NM_001290310; NM_001290312; NM_001903 NM_001323982; NM_001323983; NM_001323984; NM_001323985; NM_001323986; NM_001323987; NM_001323988; NM_001323989; NM_001323990; NM_001323991; NM_001323992; NM_001323993; NM_001323994; NM_001323995; NM_001323996; NM_001323997; NM_001323998; NM_001323999; NM_001324000; NM_001324001; NM_001324002; NM_001324003; NM_001324004; NM_001324005; NM_001324006; NM_001324007; NM_001324008; NM_001324009; NM_001324010; NM_001324011; NM_001324012; NM_001324013	NM_009818
RefSeq (protein)	NP_001277236; NP_001277238; NP_001277239; NP_001277241; NP_001310911 NP_001310912; NP_001310913; NP_001310914; NP_001310915; NP_001310916; NP_001310917; NP_001310918; NP_001310919; NP_001310920; NP_001310921; NP_001310922; NP_001310923; NP_001310924; NP_001310925; NP_001310926; NP_001310927; NP_001310928; NP_001310929; NP_001310930; NP_001310931; NP_001310932; NP_001310933; NP_001310934; NP_001310935; NP_001310936; NP_001310937; NP_001310938; NP_001310939; NP_001310940; NP_001310941; NP_001310942; NP_001894; NP_001277236.1	NP_033948
Location (UCSC)	Chr 5: 138.61 – 138.94 Mb	Chr 18: 35.25 – 35.39 Mb
PubMed search
- Wikidata
View/Edit Human	View/Edit Mouse

αE-catenin, also known as Catenin alpha-1, is a protein that in humans is encoded by the CTNNA1 gene. αE-catenin is highly expressed in cardiac muscle and localizes to adherens junctions at intercalated disc structures where it functions to mediate the anchorage of actin filaments to the sarcolemma. αE-catenin also plays a role in tumor metastasis and skin cell function.

== Structure ==
Human αE-catenin protein is 100.0 kDa and 906 amino acids. Catenins (α,β, and γ (also known as plakoglobin)) were originally identified in complex with E-cadherin, an epithelial cell adhesion protein. αE-catenin is highly expressed in cardiac muscle and is homologous to the protein vinculin; however, aside from vinculin, αE-catenin has no homology to established actin-binding proteins. The N-terminus of αE-catenin binds β-catenin or γ-catenin/plakoglobin, and the C-terminus binds actin directly or indirectly via vinculin or α-actinin.

== Function ==
Though αE-catenin exhibits substantial expression in cardiac muscle, αE-catenin is most well known for role in metastasizing tumor cells. αE-catenin also plays a role in epithelial tissue, both at adherens junctions and in signaling pathways.

In cardiomyocytes, αE-catenin is present in cell to cell regions known as adherens junctions which lie within intercalated discs; these junctions anchor the actin cytoskeleton to the sarcolemma and provide strong cell adhesion.

Functional αE-catenin is required for normal embryonic development, as a mutation eliminating the C-terminal 1/3 of the protein resulting in a complete loss-of-function phenotype showed disruption of the trophoblast epithelium and arrested development at the blastocyst stage.

αE-catenin specifically, not β- or γ-catenin, binds F-actin and organizes and tethers the filaments at regions of cell-cell contact. Studies show that full-length αE-catenin binds and bundles F-actin in a superior fashion relative to individual N-terminal or C-terminal domains.

αE-catenin, along with β-catenin and plakoglobin form distinct complexes with N-cadherin that are involved in forming cell-cell contacts and differentiation of cardiomyocytes. Catenin-N-cadherin complexes are apparently necessary for and precede the first cell to cell contact, precursory to gap junction formation. The anchorage of cadherin-catenin complexes to actin filaments by αE-catenin is regulated by tyrosine phosphorylation.

Functional insights into αE-catenin function have come from studies employing transgenesis. Mice harboring a cardiac-specific deletion of αE-catenin exhibited abnormalities in cardiac dimensions and function, representative of dilated cardiomyopathy. This was further characterized by disorganization of intercalated disc structures and mitochondria, as well as compensatory increases in β-catenin and decreases in localization of cadherin and vinculin at intercalated discs. Knockout mice also exhibited high susceptibility to death following stress.

== Interactions ==
αE-catenin has been shown to interact with:

- APC,
- Beta-catenin,
- CDH1,
- CDH2,
- CDH3
- Plakoglobin, and
- VE-cadherin.

== See also ==
- Alpha-catenin
