= Invasive lobular carcinoma =

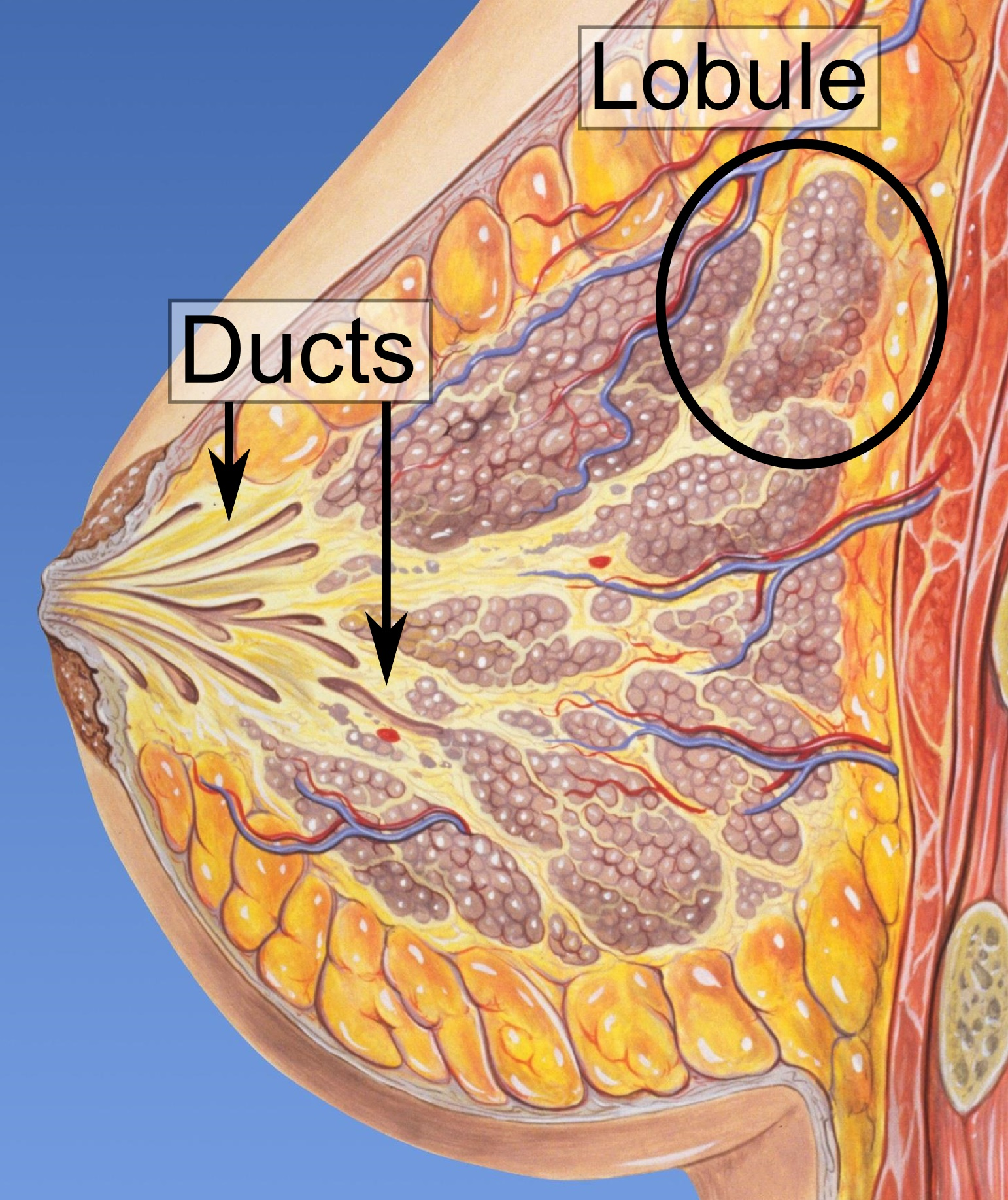
- Lobules of the mammary glands.
- Specialty: Oncology

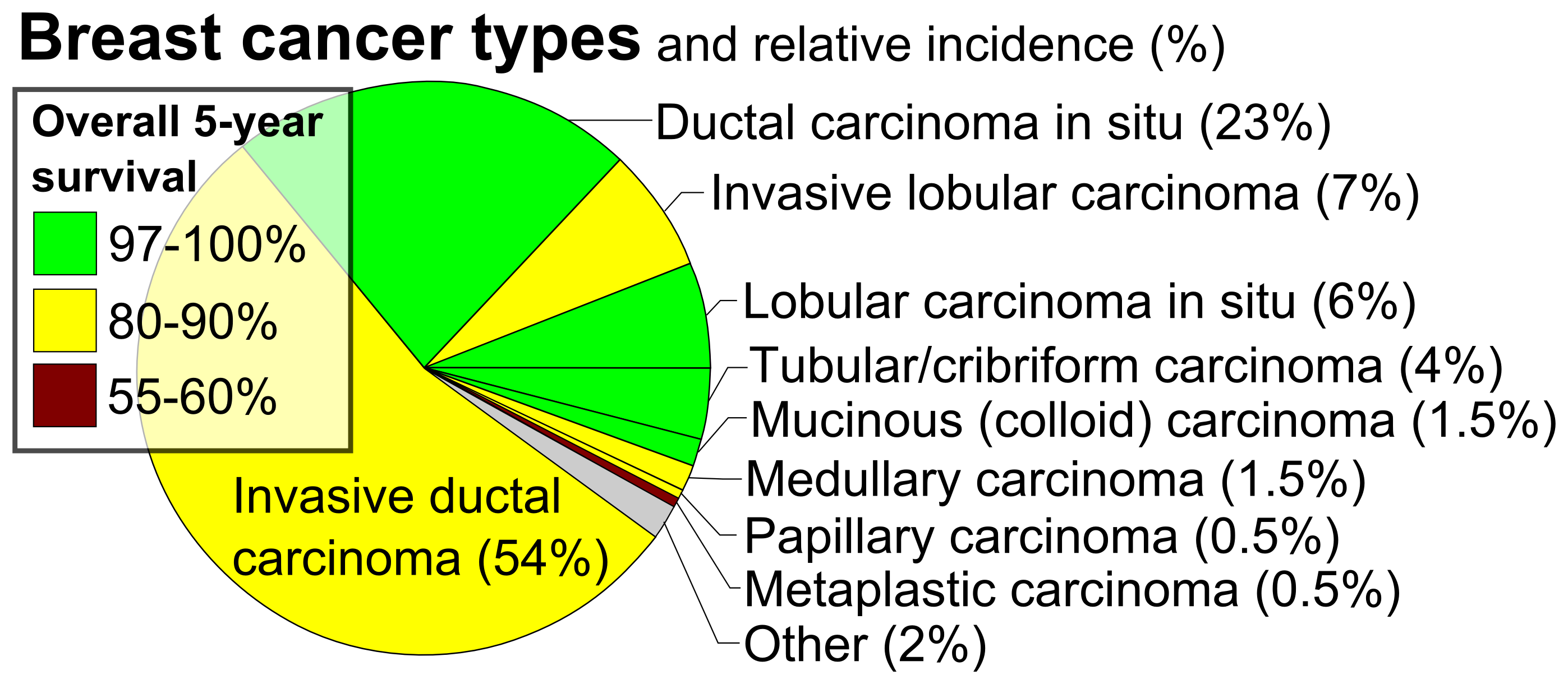
Histopathologic types of breast cancer, with relative incidences and prognoses, with "invasive lobular carcinoma" at top right

Invasive lobular carcinoma (ILC) is breast cancer arising from the lobules of the mammary glands. It accounts for 5–10% of invasive breast cancer. Rare cases of this carcinoma have been diagnosed in men (see male breast cancer).

== Types ==
Most common features
	Classic lobular	Pleomorphic lobular
Grades	Low or high (II/III)	High (III)
AJCC stage	I	II
Lymph node status	Negative	Positive
ER/PR status	Positive	Positive
Surgery type	Lumpectomy	Mastectomy

The histologic patterns include:

Type	Prevalence	Description	Image
Classical	40%	Round or ovoid cells with little cytoplasm in a single-file infiltrating pattern, sometimes concentrically giving a targetoid pattern	
Mixed	40%	No dominant pattern	
Solid	10%	Sheets of classical-appearing cells with little intervening stroma	
Alveolar	5%	Aggregates of classical-appearing cells	
Tubulolobular	5%	Cells form microtubules in >90% of tumor (smaller than in tubular carcinoma)	
Pleomorphic		Classical-appearing but with pleomorphic cells. It may include signet-ring cells, or plasmacytoid cells (pictured) which have abundant cytoplasm and eccentric nuclei.	

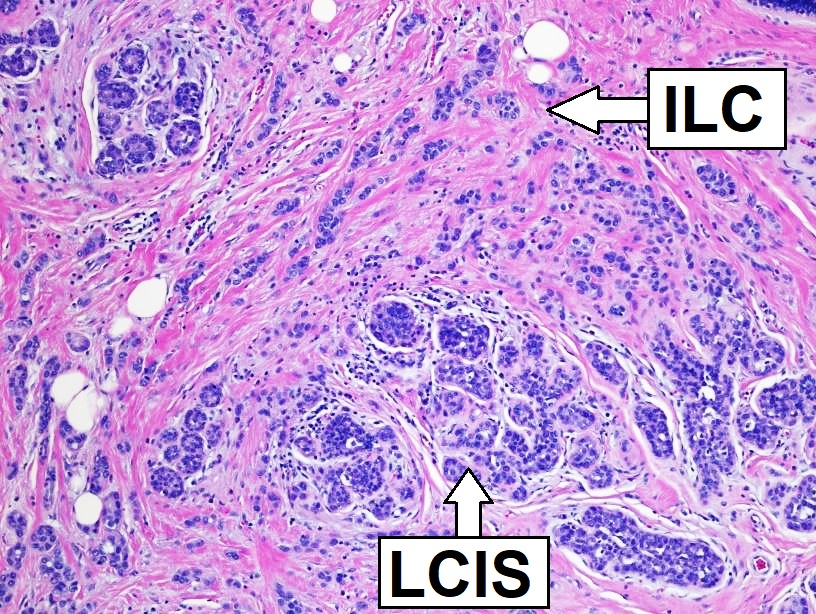
Histopathology of invasive lobular carcinoma (ILC), next to lobular carcinoma in situ (LCIS)

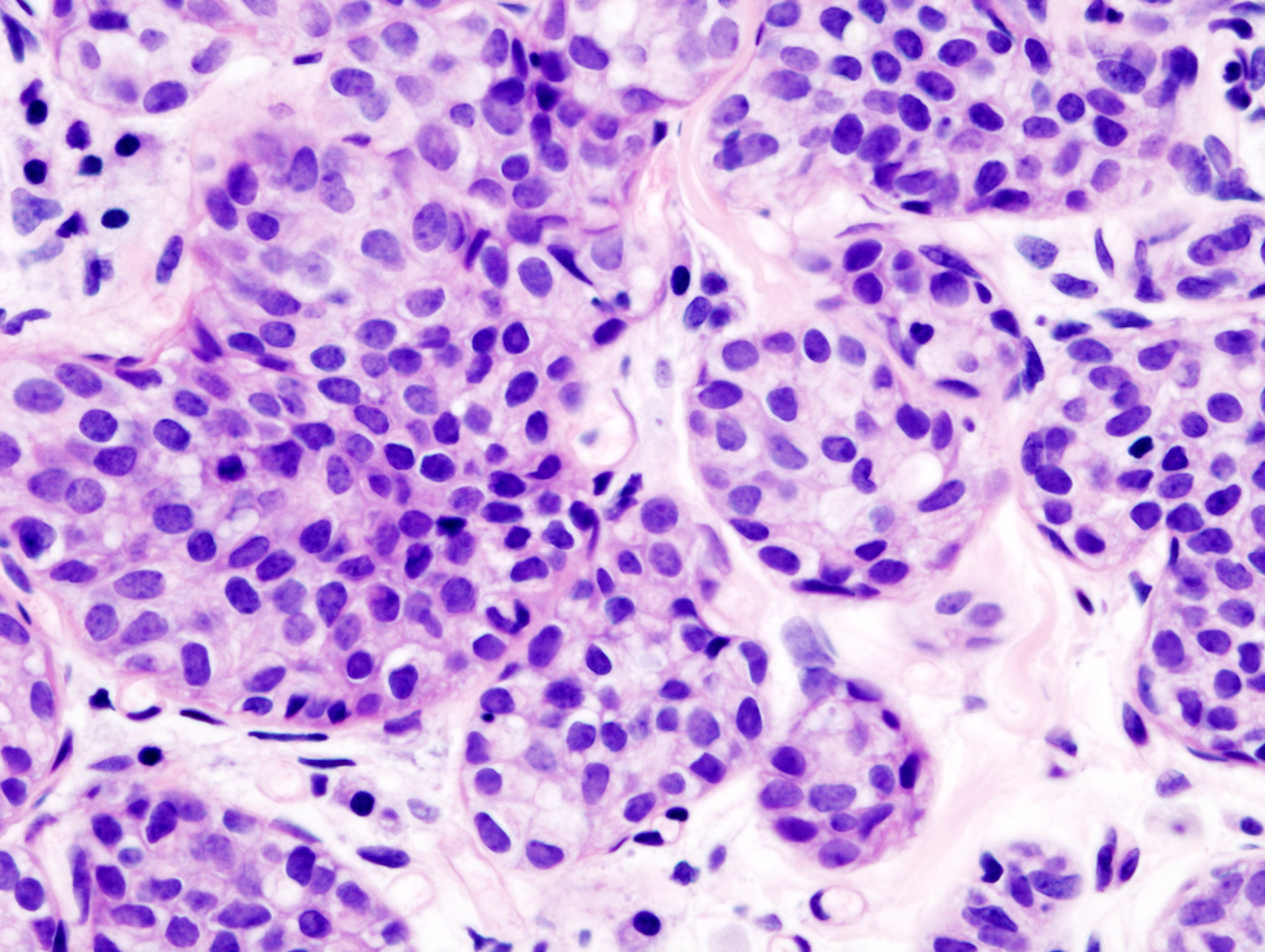
Invasive lobular carcinoma demonstrating a predominantly lobular growth pattern

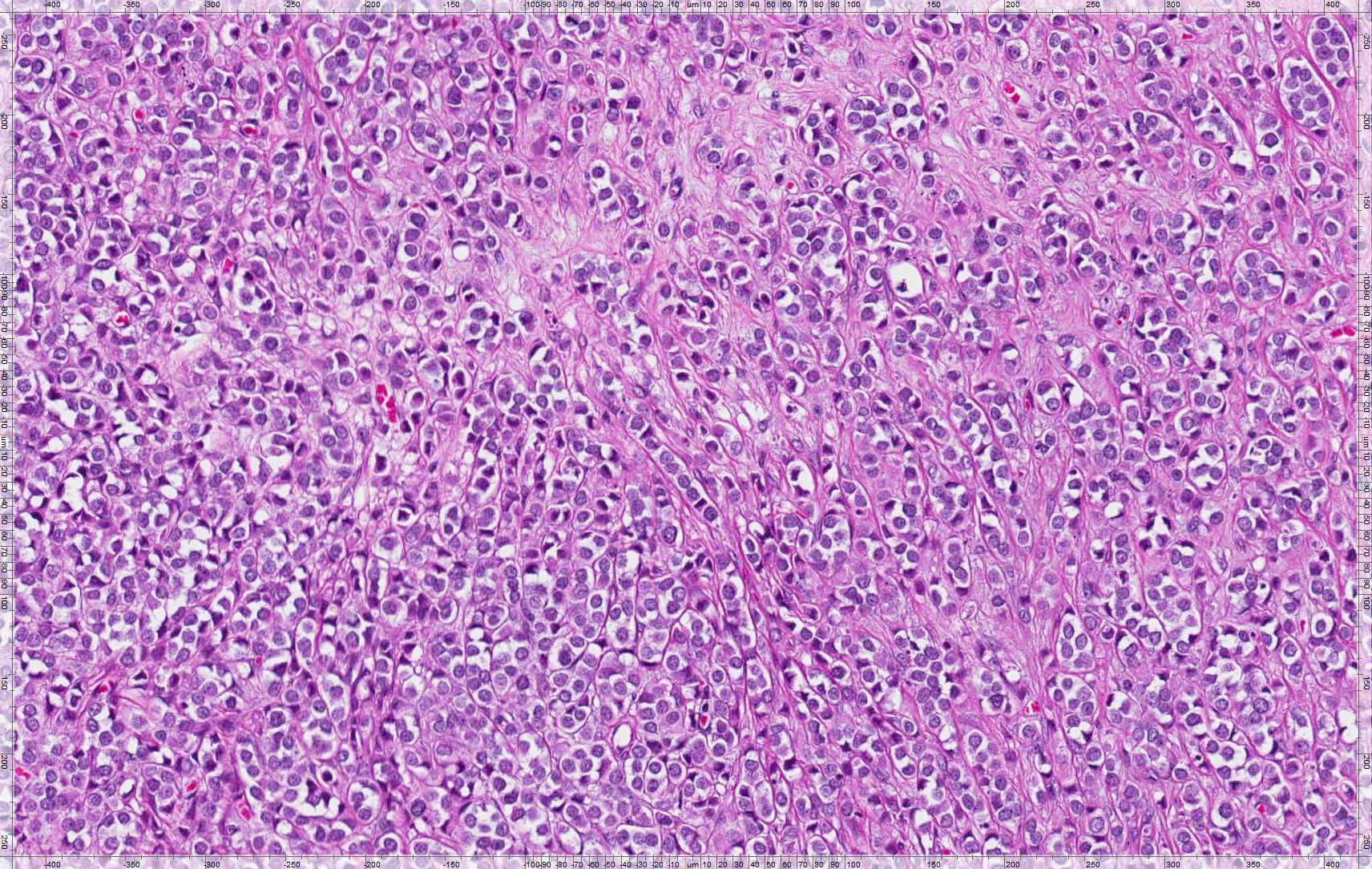
Lobular breast cancer. Single file cells and cell nests.

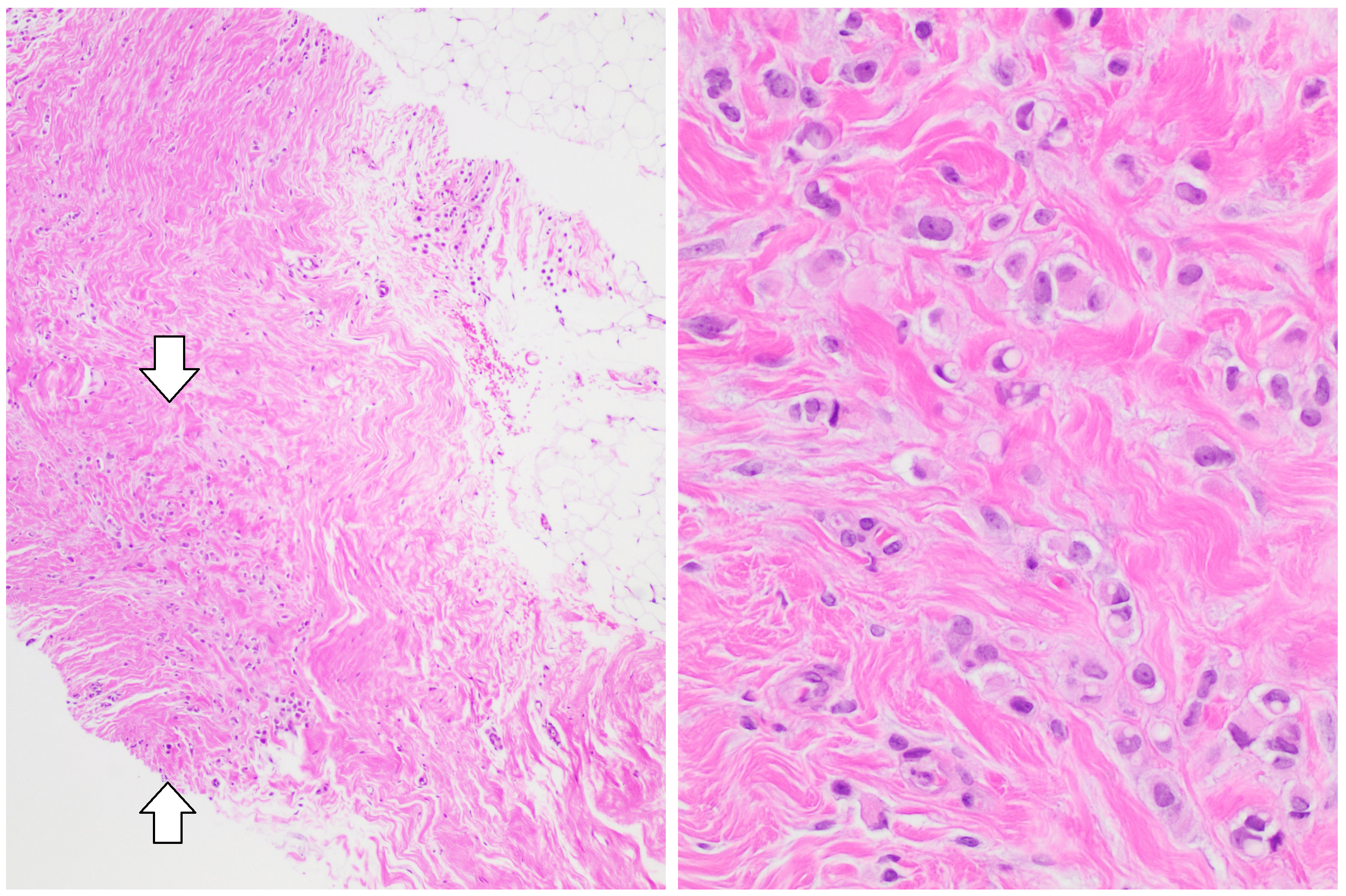
ILC may be subtle on low magnification (left). Higher magnification (right) shows invasive growth pattern and vesicular nuclei with prominent nucleoli.

== Prognosis ==
Overall, the five-year survival rate of invasive lobular carcinoma was approximately 85% in 2003.

== Diagnosis ==
On mammography, ILC shows spiculated mass with ill-defined margins that has similar or lower density than surrounding breast tissues. This happens only at 44–65% of the time. Architectural distortion on surrounding breast tissues is only seen in 10–34% of the cases. It can be reported as benign in 8–16% of the mammography cases.

Ultrasound has 68–98% sensitivity of detecting ILC. ILC shows irregular or angular mass with hypoechoic or heterogenous internal echoes, ill-defined or spiculated margins, and posterior acoustic shadowing.

Loss of E-cadherin is common in lobular carcinoma but is also seen in other breast cancers.

== Treatment ==
Treatment includes surgery and adjuvant therapy.
