= Catenin beta-1 =

Mammalian protein found in humans

CTNNB1
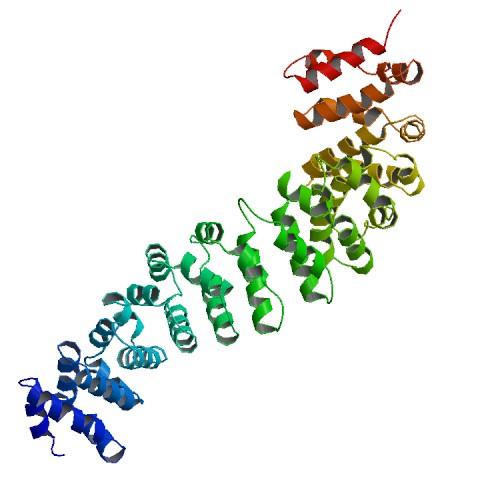

Identifiers
- Aliases: CTNNB1, CTNNB, MRD19, armadillo, catenin beta 1, EVR7, NEDSDV
- External IDs: OMIM: 116806; MGI: 88276; GeneCards: CTNNB1
Available structures
| PDB | Ortholog search: PDBe RCSB |
| PDB | List of PDB id codes 1G3J, 1JDH, 1JPW, 1LUJ, 1P22, 1QZ7, 1T08, 1TH1, 2GL7, 2Z6H, 3DIW, 3SL9, 3SLA, 3TX7, 4DJS, 3FQN, 3FQR |

Gene location (Human)
| Chr. | Chromosome 3 (human) |
| Band | 3p22.1 | Start | 41,194,741 bp |
| Band | 3p22.1 | End | 41,260,096 bp |

Gene location (Mouse)
| Chr. | Chromosome 9 (mouse) |
| Band | 9 F4|9 72.19 cM | Start | 120,758,282 bp |
| Band | 9 F4|9 72.19 cM | End | 120,789,573 bp |
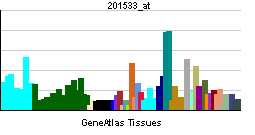
RNA expression pattern
| Bgee | Human / Mouse (ortholog); Top expressed in: ventricular zone; periodontal fiber; Achilles tendon; stromal cell of endometrium; seminal vesicula; canal of the cervix; ganglionic eminence; right ovary; mucosa of sigmoid colon; epithelium of colon / Top expressed in: primitive streak; vestibular sensory epithelium; molar; maxillary prominence; hair follicle; left lung lobe; ciliary body; vas deferens; mandibular prominence; urothelium; More reference expression data |
| BioGPS | More reference expression data |
Gene ontology
| Molecular function | DNA-binding transcription factor activity; DNA binding; protein binding; SMAD binding; chromatin binding; signal transducer activity; double-stranded DNA binding; protein C-terminus binding; protein kinase binding; kinase binding; androgen receptor binding; transmembrane transporter binding; estrogen receptor binding; I-SMAD binding; protein phosphatase binding; transcription factor binding; transcription coactivator activity; alpha-catenin binding; enzyme binding; RNA polymerase II core promoter sequence-specific DNA binding; protein heterodimerization activity; cadherin binding; disordered domain specific binding |
| Cellular component | adherens junction; beta-catenin destruction complex; protein-DNA complex; lamellipodium; beta-catenin-TCF complex; beta-catenin-TCF7L2 complex; centrosome; Z discdkac; bicellular tight junction; transcription regulator complex; lateral plasma membrane; cytoplasm; cell cortex; apical part of cell; spindle pole; Scrib-APC-beta-catenin complex; catenin-TCF7L2 complex; flotillin complex; intercalated disc; nucleus; cell-cell junction; membrane; Wnt signalosome; basolateral plasma membrane; plasma membrane; cytoskeleton; extracellular exosome; nucleoplasm; microtubule organizing center; cell periphery; apical junction complex; cell projection membrane; focal adhesion; microvillus membrane; fascia adherens; cytosol; cell junction; perinuclear region of cytoplasm; catenin complex; synapse; intracellular anatomical structure; protein-containing complex; presynaptic membrane; cell projection; postsynaptic membrane; Schaffer collateral - CA1 synapse; presynaptic active zone cytoplasmic component; postsynaptic density, intracellular component |
| Biological process | embryonic brain development; negative regulation of cell population proliferation; renal vesicle formation; positive regulation of MAPK cascade; proximal/distal pattern formation; positive regulation of neuroblast proliferation; chemical synaptic transmission; central nervous system vasculogenesis; renal inner medulla development; transcription, DNA-templated; positive regulation of neuron apoptotic process; canonical Wnt signaling pathway; embryonic foregut morphogenesis; endoderm formation; endodermal cell fate commitment; synapse organization; trachea formation; cellular process or phenomenon; positive regulation of telomere maintenance via telomerase; neural plate development; negative regulation of protein sumoylation; lung cell differentiation; vasculogenesis; lung induction; hemopoiesis; kidney development; positive regulation of gene expression; adherens junction organization; renal outer medulla development; thymus development; regulation of myelination; positive regulation of cell population proliferation; epithelial tube branching involved in lung morphogenesis; bone resorption; epithelial cell differentiation involved in prostate gland development; regulation of euchromatin binding; hair follicle morphogenesis; hair follicle placode formation; neuron migration; negative regulation of chondrocyte differentiation; fungiform papilla formation; positive regulation of type I interferon production; negative regulation of mitotic cell cycle, embryonic; ectoderm development; trachea morphogenesis; T cell differentiation in thymus; pancreas development; cranial ganglion development; regulation of apoptotic process; lung development; positive regulation of skeletal muscle tissue development; synaptic vesicle transport; positive regulation of telomerase activity; morphogenesis of embryonic epithelium; renal system development; oocyte development; hair cycle process; embryonic axis specification; embryonic forelimb morphogenesis; anterior/posterior axis specification; positive regulation of endothelial cell differentiation; regulation of transcription by RNA polymerase II; animal organ development; negative regulation of mesenchymal to epithelial transition involved in metanephros morphogenesis; dorsal/ventral axis specification; positive regulation of muscle cell differentiation; positive regulation of apoptotic process; regulation of protein localization to cell surface; androgen receptor signaling pathway; nervous system development; forebrain development; hair cell differentiation; negative regulation of transcription by RNA polymerase II; regulation of epithelial cell differentiation; positive regulation of histone H3-K4 methylation; embryonic digit morphogenesis; endothelial tube morphogenesis; osteoclast differentiation; regulation of transcription, DNA-templated; regulation of osteoclast differentiation; neuron differentiation; epithelial to mesenchymal transition; cell fate specification; odontogenesis of dentin-containing tooth; midbrain development; positive regulation of mesenchymal cell proliferation; positive regulation of heparan sulfate proteoglycan biosynthetic process; smooth muscle cell differentiation; glial cell fate determination; cell fate determination; positive regulation of determination of dorsal identity; regulation of T cell proliferation; gastrulation with mouth forming second; negative regulation of apoptotic signaling pathway; oviduct development; cellular response to growth factor stimulus; male genitalia development; negative regulation of gene expression; nephron tubule formation; regulation of osteoblast differentiation; regulation of angiogenesis; cell morphogenesis involved in differentiation; cell-matrix adhesion; dorsal root ganglion development; regulation of cell population proliferation; embryonic skeletal limb joint morphogenesis; development of the heart; T cell differentiation; dorsal/ventral pattern formation; layer formation in cerebral cortex; canonical Wnt signaling pathway involved in positive regulation of cardiac outflow tract cell proliferation; canonical Wnt signaling pathway involved in positive regulation of epithelial to mesenchymal transition; positive regulation of osteoblast differentiation; negative regulation of osteoclast differentiation; regulation of core promoter binding; genitalia morphogenesis; negative regulation of neuron death; cell maturation; cell population proliferation; branching involved in ureteric bud morphogenesis; cell differentiation; protein localization to cell surface; embryonic hindlimb morphogenesis; negative regulation of oligodendrocyte differentiation; metanephros morphogenesis; regulation of centriole-centriole cohesion; limb development; positive regulation of epithelial cell proliferation involved in prostate gland development; regulation of secondary heart field cardioblast proliferation; regulation of fibroblast proliferation; regulation of smooth muscle cell proliferation; skin development; skeletal system development; hindbrain development; regulation of calcium ion import; mesenchymal cell proliferation involved in lung development; regulation of nephron tubule epithelial cell differentiation; cellular response to indole-3-methanol; canonical Wnt signaling pathway involved in negative regulation of apoptotic process; regulation of gene expression; regulation of cell differentiation; stem cell population maintenance; regulation of neurogenesis; in utero embryonic development; lung-associated mesenchyme development; negative regulation of cell differentiation; positive regulation of I-kappaB kinase/NF-kappaB signaling; vasculature development; sympathetic ganglion development; positive regulation of epithelial cell differentiation; positive regulation of branching involved in lung morphogenesis; lens morphogenesis in camera-type eye; positive regulation of epithelial to mesenchymal transition; positive regulation of fibroblast growth factor receptor signaling pathway; embryonic heart tube development; regulation of centromeric sister chromatid cohesion; positive regulation of DNA-templated transcription, initiation; positive regulation of transcription, DNA-templated; branching involved in blood vessel morphogenesis; positive regulation of DNA-binding transcription factor activity; cell adhesion; negative regulation of transcription, DNA-templated; adherens junction assembly; positive regulation of transcription by RNA polymerase II; Wnt signaling pathway, calcium modulating pathway; beta-catenin-TCF complex assembly; beta-catenin destruction complex disassembly; cranial skeletal system development; proteasome-mediated ubiquitin-dependent protein catabolic process; Wnt signaling pathway; canonical Wnt signaling pathway involved in midbrain dopaminergic neuron differentiation; response to estradiol; midbrain dopaminergic neuron differentiation; entry of bacterium into host cell; negative regulation of oxidative stress-induced neuron death; positive regulation of core promoter binding; viral process; negative regulation of angiogenesis; negative regulation of epithelial cell differentiation; negative regulation of apoptotic process; positive regulation of molecular function; positive regulation of epithelial cell proliferation; negative regulation of neurogenesis; regulation of timing of anagen; regulation of canonical Wnt signaling pathway; synaptic vesicle clustering; cell-cell adhesion; neuron projection extension; positive regulation of neural precursor cell proliferation; protein polyubiquitination; tissue homeostasis |
Sources:Amigo / QuickGO
Orthologs
| Databases | NCBI: entry; OMA: entry |
| Species | Human | Mouse |
| Entrez | 1499 | 12387 |
| Ensembl | ENSG00000168036 | ENSMUSG00000006932 |
| UniProt | P35222 | Q02248 |
| RefSeq (mRNA) | NM_001098209; NM_001098210; NM_001904; NM_001330729 | NM_001165902; NM_007614 |
| RefSeq (protein) | NP_001091679; NP_001091680; NP_001317658; NP_001895 | NP_001159374; NP_031640 |
| Location (UCSC) | Chr 3: 41.19 – 41.26 Mb | Chr 9: 120.76 – 120.79 Mb |
| PubMed search |
- Wikidata
| View/Edit Human | View/Edit Mouse |

Catenin beta-1, also known as β-catenin (beta-catenin), is a protein that in humans is encoded by the CTNNB1 gene.

β-Catenin is a dual function protein, involved in regulation and coordination of cell–cell adhesion and gene transcription. In humans, the CTNNB1 protein is encoded by the CTNNB1 gene. In Drosophila, the homologous protein is called armadillo. β-catenin is a subunit of the cadherin protein complex and acts as an intracellular signal transducer in the Wnt signaling pathway. It is a member of the catenin protein family and homologous to γ-catenin, also known as plakoglobin. β-Catenin is widely expressed in many tissues. In cardiac muscle, β-catenin localizes to adherens junctions in intercalated disc structures, which are critical for electrical and mechanical coupling between adjacent cardiomyocytes.

Mutations and overexpression of β-catenin are associated with many cancers, including hepatocellular carcinoma, colorectal carcinoma, lung cancer, malignant breast tumors, ovarian and endometrial cancer. Alterations in the localization and expression levels of β-catenin have been associated with various forms of heart disease, including dilated cardiomyopathy. β-Catenin is regulated and destroyed by the beta-catenin destruction complex, and in particular by the adenomatous polyposis coli (APC) protein, encoded by the tumour-suppressing APC gene. Therefore, genetic mutation of the APC gene is also strongly linked to cancers, and in particular colorectal cancer resulting from familial adenomatous polyposis (FAP).

== Discovery ==
β-Catenin was initially discovered in the early 1990s as a component of a mammalian cell adhesion complex: a protein responsible for cytoplasmatic anchoring of cadherins. But very soon, it was realized that the Drosophila protein armadillo – implicated in mediating the morphogenic effects of Wingless/Wnt – is homologous to the mammalian β-catenin, not just in structure but also in function. Thus, β-catenin became one of the first examples of moonlighting: a protein performing more than one radically different cellular function.

== Structure ==
=== Protein structure ===
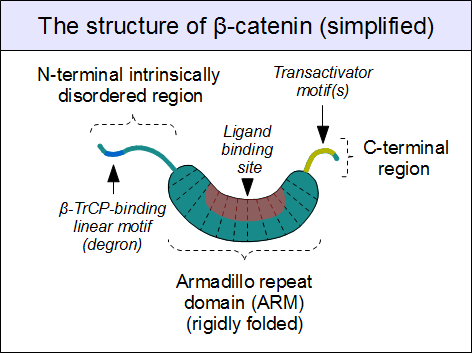
The simplified structure of β-catenin.

The core of β-catenin consists of several very characteristic repeats, each approximately 40 amino acids long. Termed armadillo repeats, all these elements fold together into a single, rigid protein domain with an elongated shape – called armadillo (ARM) domain. An average armadillo repeat is composed of three alpha helices. The first repeat of β-catenin (near the N-terminus) is slightly different from the others – as it has an elongated helix with a kink, formed by the fusion of helices 1 and 2. Due to the complex shape of individual repeats, the whole ARM domain is not a straight rod: it possesses a slight curvature, so that an outer (convex) and an inner (concave) surface is formed. This inner surface serves as a ligand-binding site for the various interaction partners of the ARM domains.

The segments N-terminal and far C-terminal to the ARM domain do not adopt any structure in solution by themselves. Yet these intrinsically disordered regions play a crucial role in β-catenin function. The N-terminal disordered region contains a conserved short linear motif responsible for binding of TrCP1 (also known as β-TrCP) E3 ubiquitin ligase – but only when it is phosphorylated. Degradation of β-catenin is thus mediated by this N-terminal segment. The C-terminal region, on the other hand, is a strong transactivator when recruited onto DNA. This segment is not fully disordered: part of the C-terminal extension forms a stable helix that packs against the ARM domain, but may also engage separate binding partners. This small structural element (HelixC) caps the C-terminal end of the ARM domain, shielding its hydrophobic residues. HelixC is not necessary for β-catenin to function in cell–cell adhesion. On the other hand, it is required for Wnt signaling: possibly to recruit various coactivators, such as 14-3-3zeta. Yet its exact partners among the general transcription complexes are still incompletely understood, and they likely involve tissue-specific players. Notably, the C-terminal segment of β-catenin can mimic the effects of the entire Wnt pathway if artificially fused to the DNA binding domain of LEF1 transcription factor.

Plakoglobin (also called γ-catenin) has a strikingly similar architecture to that of β-catenin. Not only their ARM domains resemble each other in both architecture and ligand binding capacity, but the N-terminal β-TrCP-binding motif is also conserved in plakoglobin, implying common ancestry and shared regulation with β-catenin. However, plakoglobin is a very weak transactivator when bound to DNA – this is probably caused by the divergence of their C-terminal sequences (plakoglobin appears to lack the transactivator motifs, and thus inhibits the Wnt pathway target genes instead of activating them).

=== Binding to the armadillo domain ===
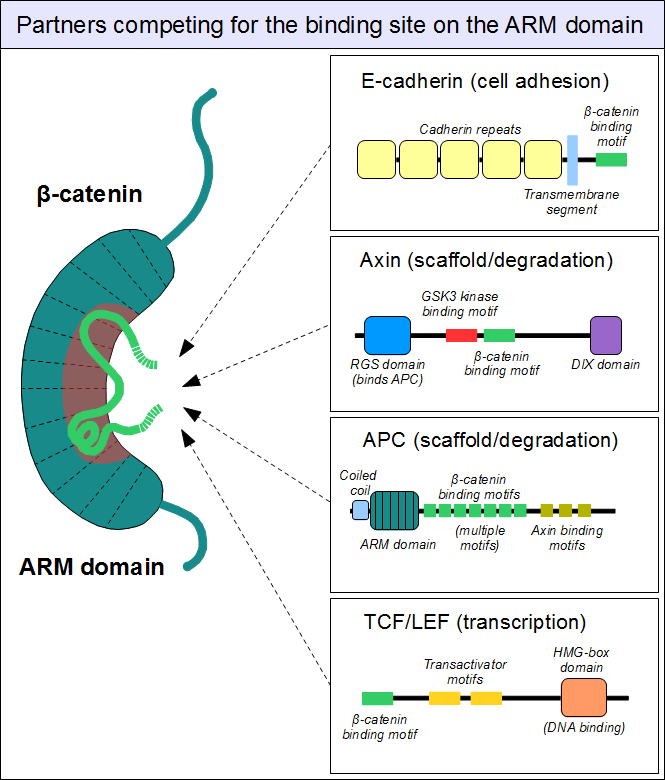
Partners competing for the main binding site on the ARM domain of β-catenin. The auxiliary binding site is not shown.

As sketched above, the ARM domain of β-catenin acts as a platform to which specific linear motifs may bind. Located in structurally diverse partners, the β-catenin binding motifs are typically disordered on their own, and typically adopt a rigid structure upon ARM domain engagement – as seen for short linear motifs. However, β-catenin interacting motifs also have a number of peculiar characteristics. First, they might reach or even surpass the length of 30 amino acids in length, and contact the ARM domain on an excessively large surface area. Another unusual feature of these motifs is their frequently high degree of phosphorylation. Such Ser/Thr phosphorylation events greatly enhance the binding of many β-catenin associating motifs to the ARM domain.

The structure of β-catenin in complex with the catenin binding domain of the transcriptional transactivation partner TCF provided the initial structural roadmap of how many binding partners of β-catenin may form interactions. This structure demonstrated how the otherwise disordered N-terminus of TCF adapted what appeared to be a rigid conformation, with the binding motif spanning many beta-catenin repeats. Relatively strong charged interaction "hot spots" were defined (predicted, and later verified, to be conserved for the β-catenin/E-cadherin interaction), as well as hydrophobic regions deemed important in the overall mode of binding and as potential therapeutic small molecule inhibitor targets against certain cancer forms. Furthermore, following studies demonstrated another peculiar characteristic, plasticity in the binding of the TCF N-terminus to beta-catenin. The ARM domain also recruits regulatory factors such as SWI/SNF ATP-dependent chromatin remodeling complexes, which bind through disordered regions found on the ARID1A subunit.

Similarly, we find the familiar E-cadherin, whose cytoplasmatic tail contacts the ARM domain in the same canonical fashion. The scaffold protein axin (two closely related paralogs, axin 1 and axin 2) contains a similar interaction motif on its long, disordered middle segment. Although one molecule of axin only contains a single β-catenin recruitment motif, its partner the adenomatous polyposis coli (APC) protein contains 11 such motifs in tandem arrangement per protomer, thus capable to interact with several β-catenin molecules at once. Since the surface of the ARM domain can typically accommodate only one peptide motif at any given time, all these proteins compete for the same cellular pool of β-catenin molecules. This competition is the key to understand how the Wnt signaling pathway works.

However, this "main" binding site on the ARM domain β-catenin is by no means the only one. The first helices of the ARM domain form an additional, special protein-protein interaction pocket: This can accommodate a helix-forming linear motif found in the coactivator BCL9 (or the closely related BCL9L) – an important protein involved in Wnt signaling. Although the precise details are much less clear, it appears that the same site is used by alpha-catenin when β-catenin is localized to the adherens junctions. Because this pocket is distinct from the ARM domain's "main" binding site, there is no competition between alpha-catenin and E-cadherin or between TCF1 and BCL9, respectively. On the other hand, BCL9 and BCL9L must compete with α-catenin to access β-catenin molecules.

== Function ==
=== Role as a transcription factor ===
β-catenin can enter the nucleus and serve as a transcription factor, although the exact mechanism for this translocation into the nucleus is still under investigation. Once in the nucleus, β-catenin interacts with T-cell factor/Lymphoid enhancer factor (TCF/LEF), switching TCF/LEF from a repressor to a transcriptional promoter. It also recruits the protein Mediator, which then recruits RNA polymerase II and other general transcription factors. The Wnt/β-catenin pathway activates transcription of many genes, notably those encoding the following products:

- Multidrug resistance-associated protein 1 (ABCB1)
- Survivin (BIRC5)
- Cyclin D1 (CCND1)
- Fibroblast growth factor 18 (FGF18)
- Matrix metalloproteinase 14 (MMP14)
- Myc proto-oncogene (MYC)

Many of the genes activated by the β-catenin pathway are directly or indirectly involved in cell growth, multiplication, and survival. These genes are important in the processes embryogenesis and tumorigenesis, making β-catenin's role as a transcription factor of particular interest to researchers.

=== Regulation of degradation through phosphorylation ===
The cellular level of β-catenin is mostly controlled by its ubiquitination and proteasomal degradation. The E3 ubiquitin ligase TrCP1 (also known as β-TrCP) can recognize β-catenin as its substrate through a short linear motif on the disordered N-terminus. However, this motif (Asp-Ser-Gly-Ile-His-Ser) of β-catenin needs to be phosphorylated on the two serines in order to be capable to bind β-TrCP. Phosphorylation of the motif is performed by glycogen synthase kinase 3 alpha and beta (GSK3α and GSK3β). GSK3s are constitutively active enzymes implicated in several important regulatory processes. There is one requirement, though: substrates of GSK3 need to be pre-phosphorylated four amino acids downstream (C-terminally) of the actual target site. Thus it also requires a "priming kinase" for its activities. In the case of β-catenin, the most important priming kinase is casein kinase 1 (CKI). Once a serine-threonine rich substrate has been "primed", GSK3 can "walk" across it from C-terminal to N-terminal direction, phosphorylating every 4th serine or threonine residue in a row. This process will result in dual phosphorylation of the aforementioned β-TrCP recognition motif as well.

=== The beta-catenin destruction complex ===
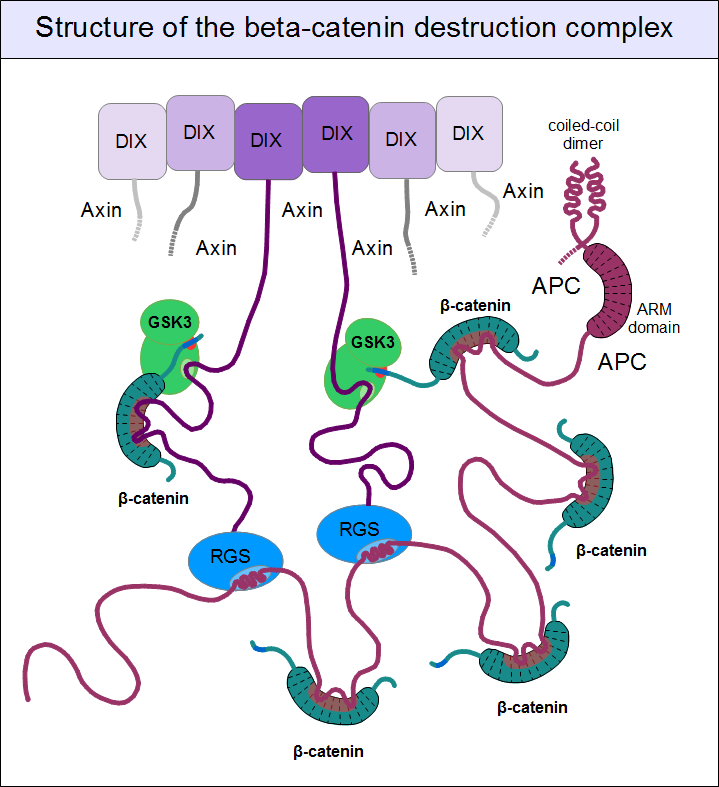
Simplified structure of the β-catenin destruction complex. Note the high proportion of intrinsically disordered segments in the axin and APC proteins.

For GSK3 to be a highly effective kinase on a substrate, pre-phosphorylation is not enough. There is one additional requirement: Similar to the mitogen-activated protein kinases (MAPKs), substrates need to associate with this enzyme through high-affinity docking motifs. β-Catenin contains no such motifs, but a special protein does: axin. What is more, its GSK3 docking motif is directly adjacent to a β-catenin binding motif. This way, axin acts as a true scaffold protein, bringing an enzyme (GSK3) together with its substrate (β-catenin) into close physical proximity.

But even axin does not act alone. Through its N-terminal regulator of G-protein signaling (RGS) domain, it recruits the adenomatous polyposis coli (APC) protein. APC is like a huge "Christmas tree": with a multitude of β-catenin binding motifs (one APC molecule alone possesses 11 such motifs), it may collect as many β-catenin molecules as possible. APC can interact with multiple axin molecules at the same time as it has three SAMP motifs (Ser-Ala-Met-Pro) to bind the RGS domains found in axin. In addition, axin also has the potential to oligomerize through its C-terminal DIX domain. The result is a huge, multimeric protein assembly dedicated to β-catenin phosphorylation. This complex is usually called the beta-catenin destruction complex, although it is distinct from the proteosome machinery actually responsible for β-catenin degradation. It only marks β-catenin molecules for subsequent destruction.

=== Wnt signaling and the regulation of destruction ===
In resting cells, axin molecules oligomerize with each other through their C-terminal DIX domains, which have two binding interfaces. Thus they can build linear oligomers or even polymers inside the cytoplasm of cells. DIX domains are unique: the only other proteins known to have a DIX domain are Dishevelled and DIXDC1. (The single Dsh protein of Drosophila corresponds to three paralogous genes, Dvl1, Dvl2 and Dvl3 in mammals.) Dsh associates with the cytoplasmic regions of Frizzled receptors with its PDZ and DEP domains. When a Wnt molecule binds to Frizzled, it induces a poorly known cascade of events, that result in the exposure of dishevelled's DIX domain and the creation of a perfect binding site for axin. Axin is then titrated away from its oligomeric assemblies – the β-catenin destruction complex – by Dsh. Once bound to the receptor complex, axin will be rendered incompetent for β-catenin binding and GSK3 activity. Importantly, the cytoplasmic segments of the Frizzled-associated LRP5 and LRP6 proteins contain GSK3 pseudo-substrate sequences (Pro-Pro-Pro-Ser-Pro-x-Ser), appropriately "primed" (pre-phosphorylated) by CKI, as if it were a true substrate of GSK3. These false target sites greatly inhibit GSK3 activity in a competitive manner. This way receptor-bound axin will abolish mediating the phosphorylation of β-catenin. Since β-catenin is no longer marked for destruction, but continues to be produced, its concentration will increase. Once β-catenin levels rise high enough to saturate all binding sites in the cytoplasm, it will also translocate into the nucleus. Upon engaging the transcription factors LEF1, TCF1, TCF2 or TCF3, β-catenin forces them to disengage their previous partners: Groucho proteins. Unlike Groucho, that recruit transcriptional repressors (e.g. histone-lysine methyltransferases), β-catenin will bind transcriptional activators, switching on target genes.

=== Role in cell–cell adhesion ===
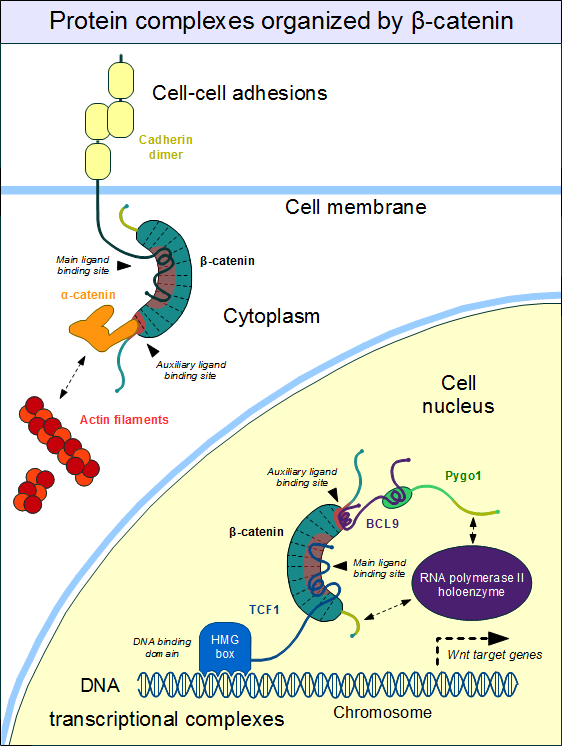
The moonlighting of β-catenin.

Cell–cell adhesion complexes are essential for the formation of complex animal tissues. β-catenin is part of a protein complex that form adherens junctions. These cell–cell adhesion complexes are necessary for the creation and maintenance of epithelial cell layers and barriers. As a component of the complex, β-catenin can regulate cell growth and adhesion between cells. It may also be responsible for transmitting the contact inhibition signal that causes cells to stop dividing once the epithelial sheet is complete. The E-cadherin – β-catenin – α-catenin complex is weakly associated to actin filaments. Adherens junctions require significant protein dynamics in order to link to the actin cytoskeleton, thereby enabling mechanotransduction.

An important component of the adherens junctions are the cadherin proteins. Cadherins form the cell–cell junctional structures known as adherens junctions as well as the desmosomes. Cadherins are capable of homophilic interactions through their extracellular cadherin repeat domains, in a Ca2+-dependent manner; this can hold adjacent epithelial cells together. While in the adherens junction, cadherins recruit β-catenin molecules onto their intracellular regions. β-catenin, in turn, associates with another highly dynamic protein, α-catenin, which directly binds to the actin filaments. This is possible because α-catenin and cadherins bind at distinct sites to β-catenin. The β-catenin – α-catenin complex can thus physically form a bridge between cadherins and the actin cytoskeleton. Organization of the cadherin–catenin complex is additionally regulated through phosphorylation and endocytosis of its components.

=== Roles in development ===
β-Catenin has a central role in directing several developmental processes, as it can directly bind transcription factors and chromatin regulators, and can be regulated by a diffusible extracellular substance: Wnt. It acts upon early embryos to induce entire body regions, as well as individual cells in later stages of development. It also regulates physiological regeneration processes.

==== Early embryonic patterning ====
Wnt signaling and β-catenin dependent gene expression plays a critical role during the formation of different body regions in the early embryo. Experimentally modified embryos that do not express this protein will fail to develop mesoderm and initiate gastrulation. Early embryos endomesoderm specification also involves the activation of the β-catenin dependent transcriptional activity by the first morphogenetic movements of embryogenesis, though mechanotransduction processes. This feature being shared by vertebrate and arthropod bilateria, and by cnidaria, it was proposed to have been evolutionary inherited from its possible involvement in the endomesoderm specification of first metazoa.

During the blastula and gastrula stages, Wnt as well as BMP and FGF pathways will induce the antero-posterior axis formation, regulate the precise placement of the primitive streak (gastrulation and mesoderm formation) as well as the process of neurulation (central nervous system development).

In Xenopus oocytes, β-catenin is initially equally localized to all regions of the egg, but it is targeted for ubiquitination and degradation by the β-catenin destruction complex. Fertilization of the egg causes a rotation of the outer cortical layers, moving clusters of the Frizzled and Dsh proteins closer to the equatorial region. β-catenin will be enriched locally under the influence of Wnt signaling pathway in the cells that inherit this portion of the cytoplasm. It will eventually translocate to the nucleus to bind TCF3 in order to activate several genes that induce dorsal cell characteristics. This signaling results in a region of cells known as the grey crescent, which is a classical organizer of embryonic development. If this region is surgically removed from the embryo, gastrulation does not occur at all. β-Catenin also plays a crucial role in the induction of the blastopore lip, which in turn initiates gastrulation. Inhibition of GSK-3 translation by injection of antisense mRNA may cause a second blastopore and a superfluous body axis to form. A similar effect can result from the overexpression of β-catenin.

==== Asymmetric cell division ====
β-catenin has also been implicated in regulation of cell fates through asymmetric cell division in the model organism C. elegans. Similarly to the Xenopus oocytes, this is essentially the result of non-equal distribution of Dsh, Frizzled, axin and APC in the cytoplasm of the mother cell.

==== Stem cell renewal ====
One of the most important results of Wnt signaling and the elevated level of β-catenin in certain cell types is the maintenance of pluripotency. The rate of stem cells in the colon is for instance ensured by such accumulation of β-catenin, which can be stimulated by the Wnt pathway. High frequency peristaltic mechanical strains of the colon are also involved in the β-catenin dependent maintenance of homeostatic levels of colonic stem cells through processes of mechanotransduction. This feature is pathologically enhanced towards tumorigenic hyperproliferation in healthy cells compressed by pressure due genetically altered hyperproliferative tumorous cells.

In other cell types and developmental stages, β-catenin may promote differentiation, especially towards mesodermal cell lineages.

==== Epithelial-to-mesenchymal transition ====
β-Catenin also acts as a morphogen in later stages of embryonic development. Together with TGF-β, an important role of β-catenin is to induce a morphogenic change in epithelial cells. It induces them to abandon their tight adhesion and assume a more mobile and loosely associated mesenchymal phenotype. During this process, epithelial cells lose expression of proteins like E-cadherin, Zonula occludens 1 (ZO1), and cytokeratin. At the same time they turn on the expression of vimentin, alpha smooth muscle actin (ACTA2), and fibroblast-specific protein 1 (FSP1). They also produce extracellular matrix components, such as type I collagen and fibronectin. Aberrant activation of the Wnt pathway has been implicated in pathological processes such as fibrosis and cancer. In cardiac muscle development, β-catenin performs a biphasic role. Initially, the activation of Wnt/β-catenin is essential for committing mesenchymal cells to a cardiac lineage; however, in later stages of development, the downregulation of β-catenin is required.

=== Involvement in cardiac physiology ===
In cardiac muscle, β-catenin forms a complex with N-cadherin at adherens junctions within intercalated disc structures, which are responsible for electrical and mechanical coupling of adjacent cardiac cells. Studies in a model of adult rat ventricular cardiomyocytes have shown that the appearance and distribution of β-catenin is spatio-temporally regulated during the redifferentiation of these cells in culture. Specifically, β-catenin is part of a distinct complex with N-cadherin and alpha-catenin, which is abundant at adherens junctions in early stages following cardiomyocyte isolation for the reformation of cell–cell contacts. It has been shown that β-catenin forms a complex with emerin in cardiomyocytes at adherens junctions within intercalated discs; and this interaction is dependent on the presence of GSK 3-beta phosphorylation sites on β-catenin. Knocking out emerin significantly altered β-catenin localization and the overall intercalated disc architecture, which resembled a dilated cardiomyopathy phenotype.

In animal models of cardiac disease, functions of β-catenin have been unveiled. In a guinea pig model of aortic stenosis and left ventricular hypertrophy, β-catenin was shown to change subcellular localization from intercalated discs to the cytosol, despite no change in the overall cellular abundance of β-catenin. Vinculin showed a similar profile of change. N-cadherin showed no change, and there was no compensatory upregulation of plakoglobin at intercalated discs in the absence of β-catenin. In a hamster model of cardiomyopathy and heart failure, cell–cell adhesions were irregular and disorganized, and expression levels of adherens junction/intercalated disc and nuclear pools of β-catenin were decreased. These data suggest that a loss of β-catenin may play a role in the diseased intercalated discs that have been associated with cardiac muscle hypertrophy and heart failure. In a rat model of myocardial infarction, adenoviral gene transfer of nonphosphorylatable, constitutively-active β-catenin decreased MI size, activated the cell cycle, and reduced the amount of apoptosis in cardiomyocytes and cardiac myofibroblasts. This finding was coordinate with enhanced expression of pro-survival proteins, survivin and Bcl-2, and vascular endothelial growth factor while promoting the differentiation of cardiac fibroblasts into myofibroblasts. These findings suggest that β-catenin can promote the regeneration and healing process following myocardial infarction. In a spontaneously-hypertensive heart failure rat model, investigators detected a shuttling of β-catenin from the intercalated disc/sarcolemma to the nucleus, evidenced by a reduction of β-catenin expression in the membrane protein fraction and an increase in the nuclear fraction. Additionally, they found a weakening in the association between glycogen synthase kinase-3β and β-catenin, which may indicate altered protein stability. Overall, results suggest that an enhanced nuclear localization of β-catenin may be important in the progression of cardiac hypertrophy.

Regarding the mechanistic role of β-catenin in cardiac hypertrophy, transgenic mouse studies have shown somewhat conflicting results regarding whether upregulation of β-catenin is beneficial or detrimental. A recent study using a conditional knockout mouse that either lacked β-catenin altogether or expressed a non-degradable form of β-catenin in cardiomyocytes reconciled a potential reason for these discrepancies. There appears to be strict control over the subcellular localization of β-catenin in cardiac muscle. Mice lacking β-catenin had no overt phenotype in the left ventricular myocardium; however, mice harboring a stabilized form of β-catenin developed dilated cardiomyopathy, suggesting that the temporal regulation of β-catenin by protein degradation mechanisms is critical for normal functioning of β-catenin in cardiac cells. In a mouse model harboring knockout of a desmosomal protein, plakoglobin, implicated in arrhythmogenic right ventricular cardiomyopathy, the stabilization of β-catenin was also enhanced, presumably to compensate for the loss of its plakoglobin homolog. These changes were coordinate with Akt activation and glycogen synthase kinase 3β inhibition, suggesting once again that the abnormal stabilization of β-catenin may be involved in the development of cardiomyopathy. Further studies employing a double knockout of plakoglobin and β-catenin showed that the double knockout developed cardiomyopathy, fibrosis and arrhythmias resulting in sudden cardiac death. Intercalated disc architecture was severely impaired and connexin 43-resident gap junctions were markedly reduced. Electrocardiogram measurements captured spontaneous lethal ventricular arrhythmias in the double transgenic animals, suggesting that the two catenins—β-catenin and plakoglobin—are critical and indispensable for mechanoelectrical coupling in cardiomyocytes.

== Clinical significance ==
=== Role in depression ===
Whether or not a given individual's brain can deal effectively with stress, and thus their susceptibility to depression, depends on the β-catenin in each person's brain, according to a study conducted at the Icahn School of Medicine at Mount Sinai and published November 12, 2014, in the journal Nature. Higher β-catenin signaling increases behavioral flexibility, whereas defective β-catenin signaling leads to depression and reduced stress management.

=== Role in cardiac disease ===
Altered expression profiles in β-catenin have been associated with dilated cardiomyopathy in humans. β-Catenin upregulation of expression has generally been observed in patients with dilated cardiomyopathy. In a particular study, patients with end-stage dilated cardiomyopathy showed almost doubled estrogen receptor alpha (ER-alpha) mRNA and protein levels, and the ER-alpha/beta-catenin interaction, present at intercalated discs of control, non-diseased human hearts was lost, suggesting that the loss of this interaction at the intercalated disc may play a role in the progression of heart failure. Together with BCL9 and PYGO proteins, β-catenin coordinates different aspects of heart development, and mutations in Bcl9 or Pygo in model organisms - such as the mouse and zebrafish - cause phenotypes that are very similar to human congenital heart disorders.

=== Involvement in cancer ===
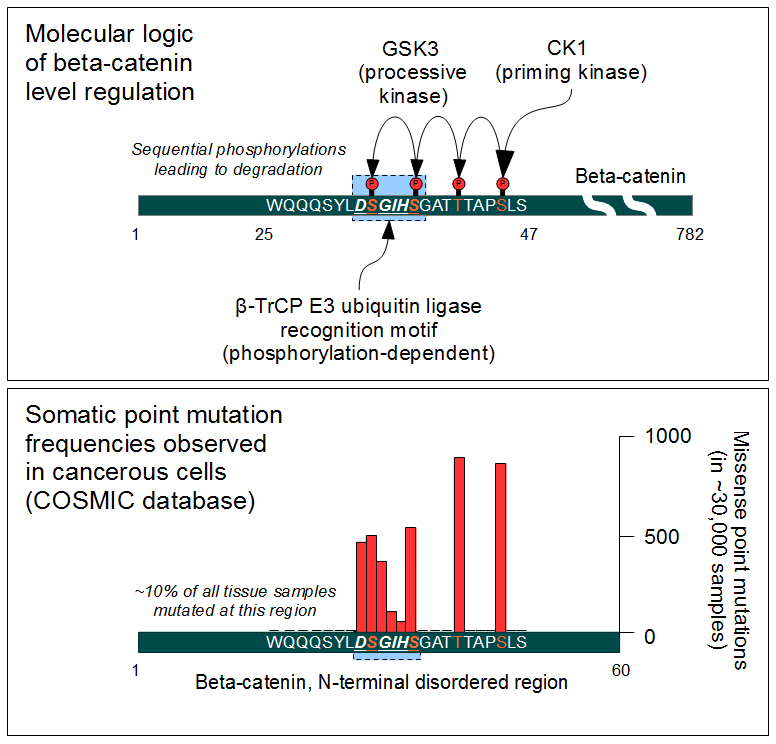
β-Catenin level regulation and cancer.

β-Catenin is a proto-oncogene. Mutations of this gene are commonly found in a variety of cancers: in primary hepatocellular carcinoma, colorectal cancer, ovarian carcinoma, breast cancer, lung cancer and glioblastoma. It has been estimated that approximately 10% of all tissue samples sequenced from all cancers display mutations in the CTNNB1 gene. Most of these mutations cluster on a tiny area of the N-terminal segment of β-catenin: the β-TrCP binding motif. Loss-of-function mutations of this motif essentially make ubiquitinylation and degradation of β-catenin impossible. It will cause β-catenin to translocate to the nucleus without any external stimulus and continuously drive transcription of its target genes. Increased nuclear β-catenin levels have also been noted in basal cell carcinoma (BCC), head and neck squamous cell carcinoma (HNSCC), prostate cancer (CaP), pilomatrixoma (PTR) and medulloblastoma (MDB) These observations may or may not implicate a mutation in the β-catenin gene: other Wnt pathway components can also be faulty.

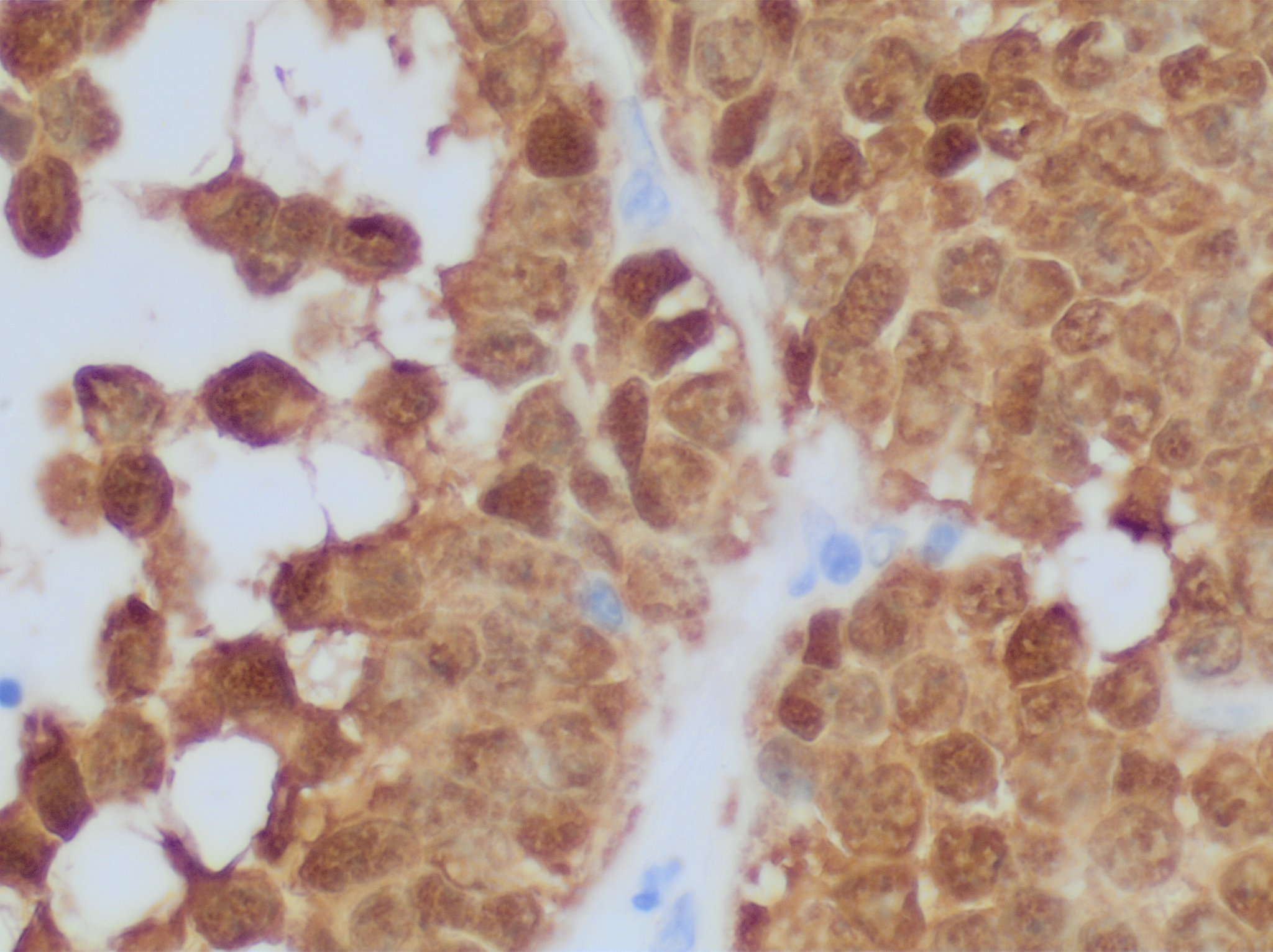
β-catenin immunohistochemistry in solid pseudopapillary tumor, staining the nuclei in 98% of such cases. Cytoplasm is also staining in this case.

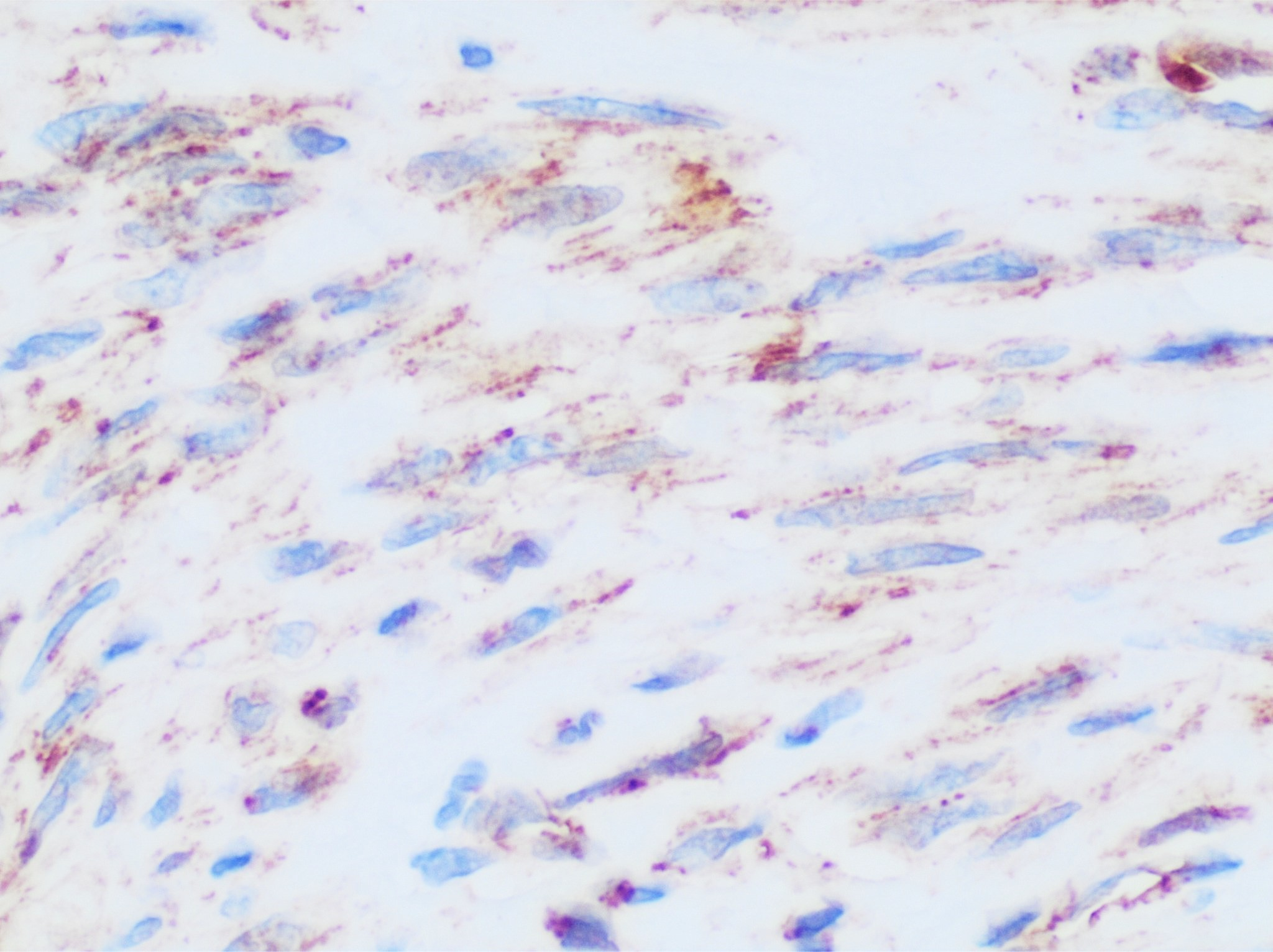
Immunohistochemistry for β-catenin in uterine leiomyoma, which is negative as there is only staining of cytoplasm but not of cell nuclei. This is a consistent finding, which helps in distinguishing such tumors from β-catenin positive spindle cell tumors.

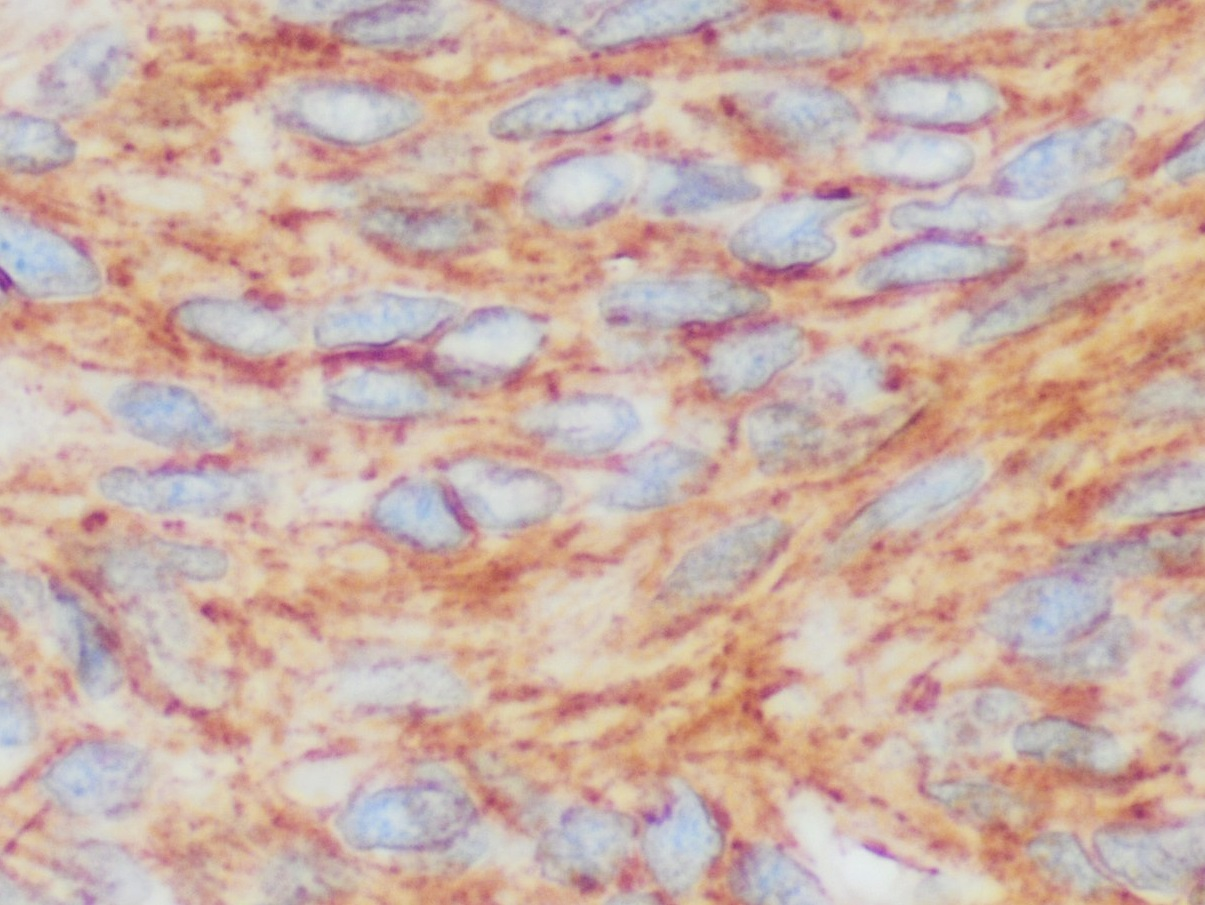
Likewise, negative nuclear staining is seen in approximately 95% of gastrointestinal stromal tumors.

Similar mutations are also frequently seen in the β-catenin recruiting motifs of APC. Hereditary loss-of-function mutations of APC cause a condition known as familial adenomatous polyposis. Affected individuals develop hundreds of polyps in their large intestine. Most of these polyps are benign in nature, but they have the potential to transform into deadly cancer as time progresses. Somatic mutations of APC in colorectal cancer are also not uncommon. β-Catenin and APC are among the key genes (together with others, like K-Ras and SMAD4) involved in colorectal cancer development. The potential of β-catenin to change the previously epithelial phenotype of affected cells into an invasive, mesenchyme-like type contributes greatly to metastasis formation.

=== As a therapeutic target ===
Due to its involvement in cancer development, inhibition of β-catenin continues to receive significant attention. But the targeting of the binding site on its armadillo domain is not the simplest task, due to its extensive and relatively flat surface. However, for an efficient inhibition, binding to smaller "hotspots" of this surface is sufficient. This way, a "stapled" helical peptide derived from the natural β-catenin binding motif found in LEF1 was sufficient for the complete inhibition of β-catenin dependent transcription. Recently, several small-molecule compounds have also been developed to target the same, highly positively charged area of the ARM domain (CGP049090, PKF118-310, PKF115-584 and ZTM000990). In addition, β-catenin levels can also be influenced by targeting upstream components of the Wnt pathway as well as the β-catenin destruction complex. The additional N-terminal binding pocket is also important for Wnt target gene activation (required for BCL9 recruitment). This site of the ARM domain can be pharmacologically targeted by carnosic acid, for example. That "auxiliary" site is another attractive target for drug development. Despite intensive preclinical research, no β-catenin inhibitors are available as therapeutic agents yet. However, its function can be further examined by siRNA knockdown based on an independent validation. Another therapeutic approach for reducing β-catenin nuclear accumulation is via the inhibition of galectin-3. The galectin-3 inhibitor GR-MD-02 is currently undergoing clinical trials in combination with the FDA-approved dose of ipilimumab in patients who have advanced melanoma. The proteins BCL9 and BCL9L have been proposed as therapeutic targets for colorectal cancers which present hyper-activated Wnt signaling, because their deletion does not perturb normal homeostasis but strongly affects metastases behaviour.

=== Role in fetal alcohol syndrome ===
β-catenin destabilization by ethanol is one of two known pathways whereby alcohol exposure induces fetal alcohol syndrome (the other is ethanol-induced folate deficiency). Ethanol leads to β-catenin destabilization via a G-protein-dependent pathway, wherein activated Phospholipase Cβ hydrolyzes phosphatidylinositol-(4,5)-bisphosphate to diacylglycerol and inositol-(1,4,5)-trisphosphate. Soluble inositol-(1,4,5)-trisphosphate triggers calcium to be released from the endoplasmic reticulum. This sudden increase in cytoplasmic calcium activates Ca2+/calmodulin-dependent protein kinase (CaMKII). Activated CaMKII destabilizes β-catenin via a poorly characterized mechanism, but which likely involves β-catenin phosphorylation by CaMKII. The β-catenin transcriptional program (which is required for normal neural crest cell development) is thereby suppressed, resulting in premature neural crest cell apoptosis (cell death).

== Interactions ==
β-Catenin has been shown to interact with:

- APC,
- ARID1A,
- AXIN1,
- Androgen receptor,
- CBY1,
- CDH1,
- CDH2,
- CDH3,
- CDK5R1,
- CHUK,
- CTNND1,
- CTNNA1,
- EGFR,
- Emerin
- ESR1
- FHL2,
- GSK3B,
- HER2/neu,
- HNF4A,
- IKK2,
- LEF1 including transgenically,
- MAGI1,
- MUC1,
- NR5A1,
- PCAF,
- PHF17,
- Plakoglobin,
- PTPN14,
- PTPRF,
- PTPRK (PTPkappa),
- PTPRT (PTPrho),
- PTPRU (PCP-2),
- PSEN1,
- PTK7
- RuvB-like 1,
- SMAD7,
- SMARCA4
- SLC9A3R1,
- SWI/SNF,
- USP9X, and
- VE-cadherin.
- XIRP1

== See also ==
- Catenin
