= BCL9 =

Protein-coding gene in humans

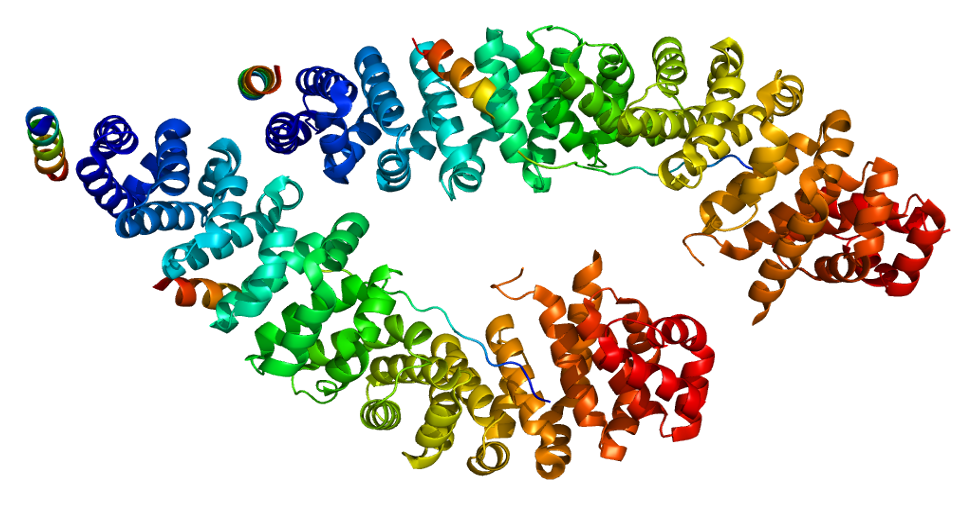

Identifiers
- Aliases: BCL9, LGS, B-cell CLL/lymphoma 9, B cell CLL/lymphoma 9, transcription coactivator, BCL9 transcription coactivator
- External IDs: OMIM: 602597; MGI: 1924828; GeneCards: BCL9
Available structures
PDB	Ortholog search: PDBe RCSB
PDB	List of PDB id codes 2GL7, 2VP7, 2VPB, 2VPD, 2VPE, 2VPG, 3SL9

Gene location (Human)
Chr.	Chromosome 1 (human)
Band	1q21.2	Start	147,541,501 bp
Band	1q21.2	End	147,626,216 bp

Gene location (Mouse)
Chr.	Chromosome 3 (mouse)
Band	3|3 F2.1	Start	97,110,978 bp
Band	3|3 F2.1	End	97,205,233 bp
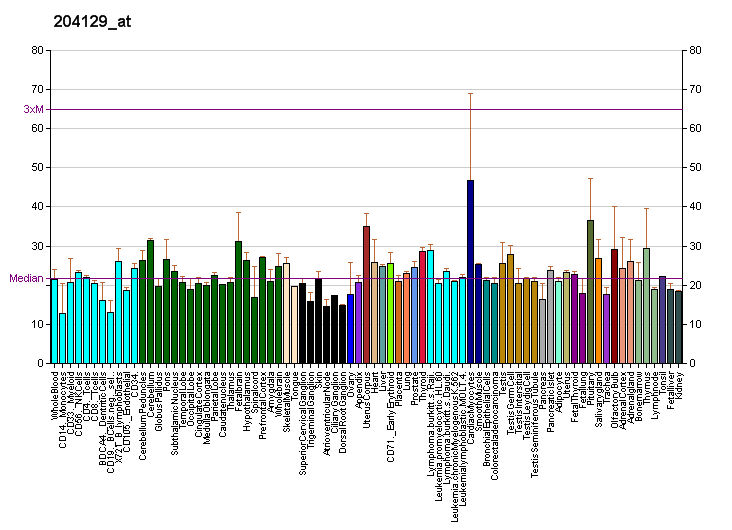
RNA expression pattern
Bgee	Human / Mouse (ortholog); Top expressed in: ganglionic eminence; ventricular zone; islet of Langerhans; right uterine tube; smooth muscle tissue; left uterine tube; body of uterus; cerebellar cortex; cerebellar hemisphere; cardia / Top expressed in: genital tubercle; tail of embryo; zygote; Rostral migratory stream; ventricular zone; neural layer of retina; ganglionic eminence; secondary oocyte; neural tube; Paneth cell; More reference expression data
BioGPS	More reference expression data
Gene ontology
Molecular function	beta-catenin binding; protein binding; transcription coactivator activity
Cellular component	cytoplasm; cis-Golgi network; Golgi apparatus; nucleus; nucleoplasm; beta-catenin-TCF complex
Biological process	skeletal muscle cell differentiation; canonical Wnt signaling pathway; Wnt signaling pathway; somatic stem cell population maintenance; myotube differentiation involved in skeletal muscle regeneration; positive regulation of transcription by RNA polymerase II; regulation of transforming growth factor beta receptor signaling pathway; beta-catenin-TCF complex assembly
Sources:Amigo / QuickGO
Orthologs
Databases	NCBI: entry; OMA: entry
Species	Human	Mouse
Entrez	607	77578
Ensembl	ENSG00000116128	ENSMUSG00000038256
UniProt	O00512	Q9D219
RefSeq (mRNA)	NM_004326	NM_029933
RefSeq (protein)	NP_004317	NP_084209
Location (UCSC)	Chr 1: 147.54 – 147.63 Mb	Chr 3: 97.11 – 97.21 Mb
PubMed search
- Wikidata
View/Edit Human	View/Edit Mouse

B-cell CLL/lymphoma 9 protein is a protein that in humans is encoded by the BCL9 gene.

== Function ==
BCL9, together with its paralogue gene BCL9L (BCL9 like or BCL9.2), have been extensively studied for their role as transcriptional beta-catenin cofactors, fundamental for the transcription of Wnt target genes.

Recent work, using the mouse (Mus musculus) and zebrafish (Danio rerio) as model organisms, identified an ancient role of BCL9 and BCL9L as key factors required for cardiac development. This work emphasises the tissue-specific nature of the Wnt/β-catenin mechanism of action, and implicates alterations in BCL9 and BCL9L in human congenital heart defects.

BCL9 and BCL9L have been shown to take part in other tissue-specific molecular mechanisms, showing that their role in the Wnt signaling cascade is only one aspect of their mode of action.

The conserved homology domain HD1 of BCL9 (and BCL9L) has recently been shown to be interacting with TBX3 in the context of intestinal carcinogenesis; this interaction mediates some tissue-specific signalling functions of the protein.

== Clinical significance ==
BCL9 is associated with B-cell acute lymphoblastic leukemia. It may be a target of translocation in B-cell malignancies with abnormalities of 1q21. The overexpression of BCL9 may be of pathogenic significance in B-cell malignancies.

BCL9 and BCL9L are potential clinical targets for human cancers; for instance, the gene expression changes that they promote is associated with a poor outcome in colorectal cancer.

Like BCL2, BCL3, BCL5, BCL6, BCL7A, and BCL10, it has clinical significance in lymphoma.

Common variations in the BCL9 gene, which is in the distal area, confer risk of schizophrenia and may also be associated with bipolar disorder and major depressive disorder.

BCL9, together with the paralogue protein BCL9l and PYGO2 also have cytoplasmic functions during tooth development and is particularly important for the formation of enamel. Mice lacking both Pygo1 and Pygo2 or both Bcl9 and Bcl9l develop teeth, a process that requires Wnt/β-catenin transcriptional regulation, but the enamel is structurally disorganized and contains less iron than teeth from control mice. Bcl9, Bcl9l, and Pygo2 are present in the cytoplasm of ameloblasts, the cells that secrete enamel proteins, and colocalize in these cells with amelogenin, the main component of enamel, encoded by the AMELX gene, which has been already implicated as a causative factor of Amelogenesis Imperfecta in humans. Bcl9 interacts with amelogenin and proteins involved in exocytosis and vesicular trafficking, suggesting that these proteins function in the trafficking or secretion of enamel proteins. Therefore, Bcl9, Bcl9l, and Pygo2 have cytoplasmic functions distinct from their roles as transcriptional cofactors downstream of Wnt signaling. This new discovery might improve our understanding for the treatment of human caries.

== Related gene problems ==
- 1q21.1 deletion syndrome
- 1q21.1 duplication syndrome
