= TB006 =

Monoclonal antibody

TB006 is a humanized monoclonal antibody targeting galectin-3, which is suspected to be a factor in the formation of amyloid plaques.

The drug is being developed by TrueBinding Inc.

TB006 has potential to reverse Alzheimer’s Disease (AD) progress by blocking Gal-3. TB006 preventing the aggregation of Aβ and facilitating the dissolution of existing plaques. This mechanism restores synaptic integrity, potentially improving cognitive function in AD patients. The drug also helps to reduce inflammation associated with Alzheimer's disease. The efficacy of TB006 was supported by strong pre-clinical AD animal model studies. TB006 has showed promising results in a phase 2a clinical trial. In May 2023, the FDA granted the initial approval for the use of TB006 in treating patients with dementia and Alzheimer’s disease under the Expanded Access Program. The drug is administered to participants at a dose of 4,000 milligrams intravenously (IV) over 1 hour every 28 days ± 5 days. As of 2025 human testing was underway. TB006 is also being studied for Parkinson's disease and Autism Spectrum Disorder.
