= Selvigaltin =

Chemical compound

Clinical data
- Other names: GB1211

Legal status
- Legal status: Investigational

Identifiers
- IUPAC name: (2R,3R,4S,5R,6R)-2-(5-Bromopyridin-3-yl)sulfanyl-6-(hydroxymethyl)-4-[4-(3,4,5-trifluorophenyl)triazol-1-yl]oxane-3,5-diol
- PubChem CID: 122443488
- IUPHAR/BPS: 11202
- ChemSpider: 115010772
- UNII: 94EN2E6BLW
- KEGG: D12763
- ChEMBL: ChEMBL5182222

Chemical and physical data
- Formula: C_{19}H_{16}BrF_{3}N_{4}O_{4}S
- Molar mass: 533.32 g·mol^{−1}
- 3D model (JSmol): Interactive image
- SMILES: C1=C(C=C(C(=C1F)F)F)C2=CN(N=N2)[C@H]3[C@H]([C@H](O[C@@H]([C@@H]3O)SC4=CC(=CN=C4)Br)CO)O
- InChI: InChI=1S/C19H16BrF3N4O4S/c20-9-3-10(5-24-4-9)32-19-18(30)16(17(29)14(7-28)31-19)27-6-13(25-26-27)8-1-11(21)15(23)12(22)2-8/h1-6,14,16-19,28-30H,7H2/t14-,16+,17+,18-,19-/m1/s1; Key:FNCLKJPMEFPXOR-QFACEVIFSA-N

Selvigaltin (GB1211) is the first small-molecule, orally delivered galectin-3 inhibitor to be discovered. It is developed by Galecto Biotech, which is testing the molecule to see if it reduces decompensated cirrhosis and resistance to checkpoint inhibitors (a type of anti-cancer drug).
