= JADE3 =

Protein-coding gene in humans

Identifiers
- Aliases: JADE3, JADE-3, PHF16, jade family PHD finger 3
- External IDs: OMIM: 300618; MGI: 2148019; GeneCards: JADE3

Gene location (Human)
| Chr. | X chromosome (human) |
| Band | Xp11.3 | Start | 46,912,276 bp |
| Band | Xp11.3 | End | 47,061,242 bp |

Gene location (Mouse)
| Chr. | X chromosome (mouse) |
| Band | X|X A1.3 | Start | 20,291,927 bp |
| Band | X|X A1.3 | End | 20,386,178 bp |
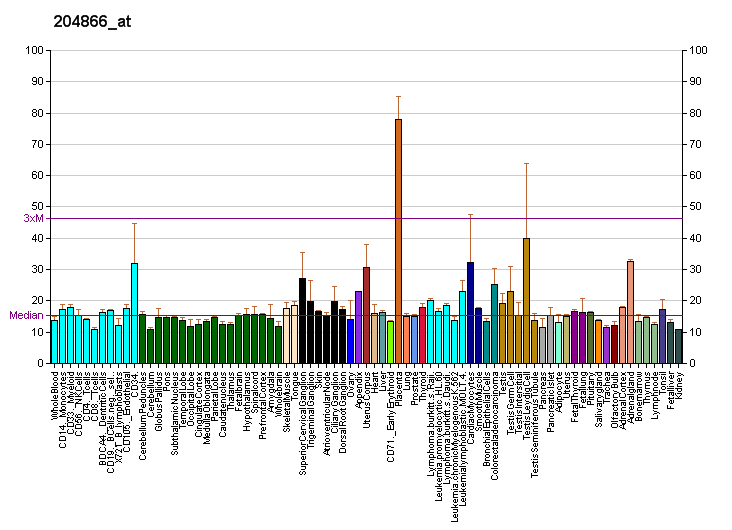
RNA expression pattern
| Bgee | Human / Mouse (ortholog); Top expressed in: corpus epididymis; caput epididymis; placenta; right adrenal cortex; seminal vesicula; ganglionic eminence; secondary oocyte; left adrenal gland; left adrenal cortex; gonad / Top expressed in: tail of embryo; superior cervical ganglion; genital tubercle; yolk sac; medullary collecting duct; cumulus cell; primitive streak; ovary; islet of Langerhans; urothelium; More reference expression data |
| BioGPS | More reference expression data |
Gene ontology
| Molecular function | protein binding; metal ion binding |
| Cellular component | histone acetyltransferase complex |
| Biological process | histone H4-K16 acetylation; histone H4-K8 acetylation; histone H4-K12 acetylation; histone H3 acetylation; histone H4-K5 acetylation |
Sources:Amigo / QuickGO
Orthologs
| Databases | NCBI: entry; OMA: entry |
| Species | Human | Mouse |
| Entrez | 9767 | 382207 |
| Ensembl | ENSG00000102221 | ENSMUSG00000037315 |
| UniProt | Q92613 | Q6IE82 |
| RefSeq (mRNA) | NM_014735; NM_001077445 | NM_001289684; NM_199317 |
| RefSeq (protein) | NP_001070913; NP_055550 | NP_001276613; NP_955021; NP_001393168; NP_001393169; NP_001393170 |
| Location (UCSC) | Chr X: 46.91 – 47.06 Mb | Chr X: 20.29 – 20.39 Mb |
| PubMed search |
- Wikidata
| View/Edit Human | View/Edit Mouse |

Protein Jade-3 is a protein that in humans is encoded by the JADE3 gene (previously PHF16).

This gene is part of a gene cluster on chromosome Xp11.23. The encoded protein contains a zinc finger motif often found in transcriptional regulators, however, its exact function is not known. Alternative splicing results in multiple transcript variants encoding the same protein.

== See also ==
- JADE1
