= Galecto Biotech =

Danish biotechnology company

Galecto Biotech is a biotechnology company that develops small molecules for the treatment of severe diseases, including fibrosis, cancer and inflammation. The company was founded in 2011 by leading galectin scientists and biotech executives from Sweden, United Kingdom, and Denmark. The company today is incorporated in the U.S., and has its operating headquarters in Copenhagen, Denmark.

The company builds on more than 10 years of research centering on the role of galectin-3 and LOXL-2, and the use of modulators of these proteins to treat fibrosis-related diseases and cancer. Combined with a strong patent estate, these assets give Galecto a unique therapeutic platform.

Galecto's lead product candidate, GB0139, is an inhaled inhibitor of galectin-3. GB0139 is being developed for the treatment of severe fibrotic lung diseases such as idiopathic pulmonary fibrosis (IPF), in which there is high unmet medical need. The company's portfolio also includes GB1211, an orally delivered galectin-3 inhibitor, for the treatment of systemic fibrotic diseases, including liver cirrhosis; and GB2064, an inhibitor of lysyl oxidase like 2, or LOXL2, an enzyme directly involved in formation of fibrosis which was part of the company's plan to develop in myelofibrosis.
