= Galectin-3 =

Protein-coding gene in the species Homo sapiens

LGALS3
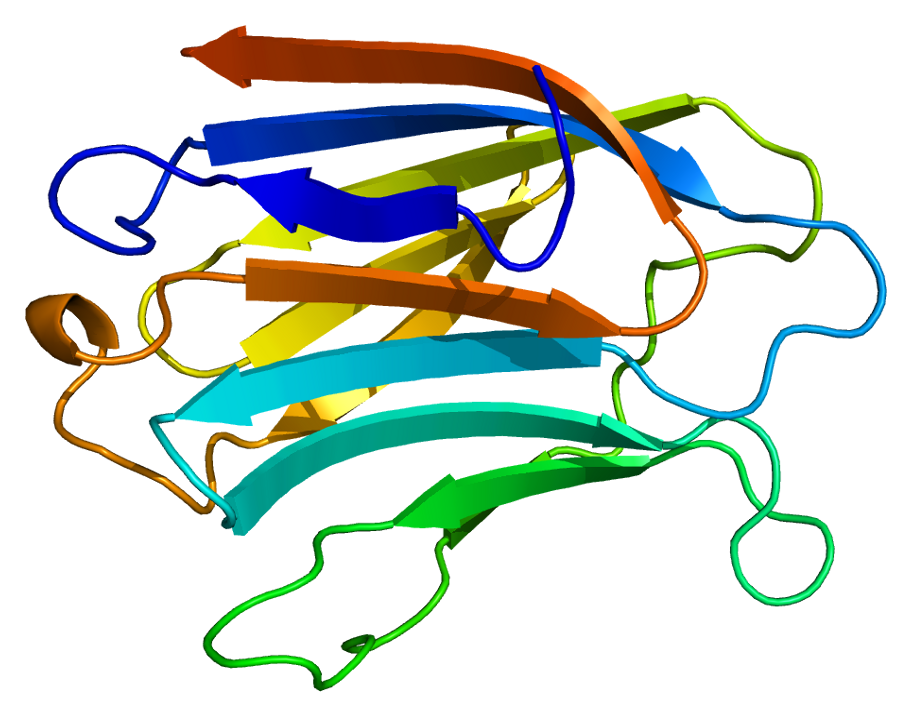

Identifiers
- Aliases: LGALS3, CBP35, GAL3, GALBP, GALIG, L31, LGALS2, MAC2, lectin, galactoside binding soluble 3, galectin 3
- External IDs: OMIM: 153619; MGI: 96778; GeneCards: LGALS3
Available structures
| PDB | Ortholog search: PDBe RCSB |
| PDB | List of PDB id codes 1A3K, 1KJL, 1KJR, 2NMN, 2NMO, 2NN8, 2XG3, 3AYA, 3AYC, 3AYD, 3AYE, 3T1L, 3T1M, 3ZSJ, 3ZSK, 3ZSL, 3ZSM, 4BLI, 4BLJ, 4BM8, 4JC1, 4JCK, 4LBJ, 4LBK, 4LBL, 4LBM, 4LBN, 4LBO, 4R9A, 4R9B, 4R9C, 4R9D, 4RL7, 4XBN, 5H9R, 5H9P |

Gene location (Human)
| Chr. | Chromosome 14 (human) |
| Band | 14q22.3 | Start | 55,124,110 bp |
| Band | 14q22.3 | End | 55,145,423 bp |

Gene location (Mouse)
| Chr. | Chromosome 14 (mouse) |
| Band | 14|14 C1 | Start | 47,605,208 bp |
| Band | 14|14 C1 | End | 47,623,617 bp |
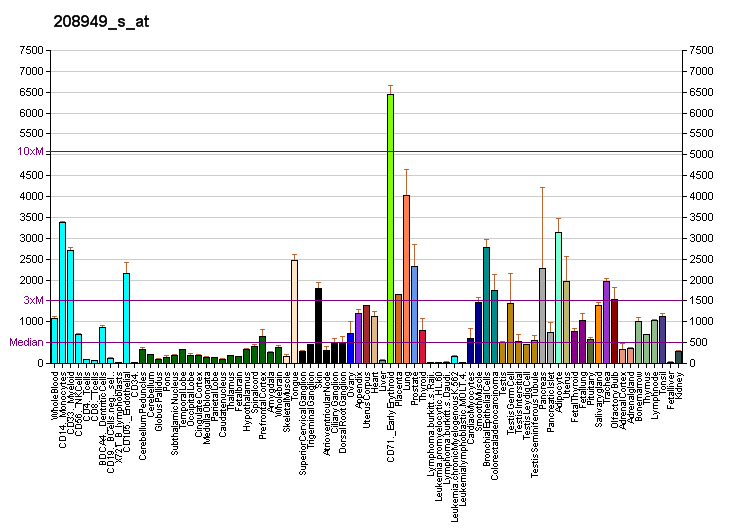
RNA expression pattern
| Bgee | Human / Mouse (ortholog); Top expressed in: mucosa of colon; palpebral conjunctiva; mucosa of sigmoid colon; bronchial epithelial cell; nasal epithelium; decidua; mucosa of ileum; jejunal mucosa; mucosa of transverse colon; amniotic fluid / Top expressed in: skin of external ear; left colon; decidua; transitional epithelium of urinary bladder; calvaria; granulocyte; gastrula; stroma of bone marrow; lip; skin of abdomen; More reference expression data |
| BioGPS | More reference expression data |
Gene ontology
| Molecular function | protein binding; chemoattractant activity; IgE binding; laminin binding; carbohydrate binding; RNA binding; oligosaccharide binding; protein phosphatase inhibitor activity; protein phosphatase binding |
| Cellular component | cytoplasm; membrane; extracellular matrix; plasma membrane; immunological synapse; mitochondrial inner membrane; spliceosomal complex; extracellular exosome; nucleus; extracellular space; secretory granule membrane; ficolin-1-rich granule membrane; galectin complex; extracellular region; cell surface; collagen-containing extracellular matrix |
| Biological process | negative regulation of endocytosis; cell differentiation; regulation of T cell proliferation; negative regulation of immunological synapse formation; epithelial cell differentiation; monocyte chemotaxis; immune system process; mRNA processing; eosinophil chemotaxis; negative regulation of extrinsic apoptotic signaling pathway; positive regulation of mononuclear cell migration; neutrophil chemotaxis; negative regulation of T cell receptor signaling pathway; mononuclear cell migration; positive regulation of calcium ion import; macrophage chemotaxis; regulation of T cell apoptotic process; RNA splicing; positive regulation of dendritic cell differentiation; regulation of extrinsic apoptotic signaling pathway via death domain receptors; negative regulation of T cell activation via T cell receptor contact with antigen bound to MHC molecule on antigen presenting cell; positive chemotaxis; innate immune response; neutrophil degranulation; antimicrobial humoral immune response mediated by antimicrobial peptide; regulation of myeloid cell differentiation; positive regulation of protein homodimerization activity; positive regulation of protein localization to plasma membrane; negative regulation of protein tyrosine phosphatase activity |
Sources:Amigo / QuickGO
Orthologs
| Databases | NCBI: entry; OMA: entry |
| Species | Human | Mouse |
| Entrez | 3958 | 16854 |
| Ensembl | ENSG00000131981 | ENSMUSG00000050335 |
| UniProt | P17931 | P16110 |
| RefSeq (mRNA) | NM_001177388; NM_002306; NM_001357678 | NM_001145953; NM_010705 |
| RefSeq (protein) | NP_002297; NP_001344607 | n/a |
| Location (UCSC) | Chr 14: 55.12 – 55.15 Mb | Chr 14: 47.61 – 47.62 Mb |
| PubMed search |
- Wikidata
| View/Edit Human | View/Edit Mouse |

Galectin-3 is a protein that in humans is encoded by the LGALS3 gene, located on chromosome 14, locus q21–q22. It is a carbohydrate-binding protein and therefore a member of the lectin group, specifically the galactoside-binding lectins known as galectins, of which 14 mammalian examples have been described. It is approximately 30 kDa and, like all galectins, contains a carbohydrate-binding module (CBM) of about 130 amino acids which enables specific binding of β-galactosides.

Due to their ability to interact with myriad galactose-bearing glycans on external cellular glycoproteins, galectins such as galectin-3 play important roles in cell-cell adhesion, cell-matrix interactions, macrophage activation, angiogenesis, metastasis, apoptosis. Likely due to this, galectin-3 is expressed in the nucleus, cytoplasm, mitochondrion, cell surface (including membrane-bound and carbohydrate-intracting proteins), and the extracellular space.

== Function ==
Galectin-3 has an affinity for beta-galactosides and exhibits antimicrobial activity against bacteria and fungi.

This protein has been shown to be involved in the following biological processes: cell adhesion, cell activation and chemoattraction, cell growth and differentiation, cell cycle, and apoptosis. Given galectin-3's broad biological functionality, it has been demonstrated to be involved in cancer, inflammation and fibrosis, heart disease, and stroke. Studies have also shown that the expression of galectin-3 is implicated in a variety of processes associated with heart failure, including myofibroblast proliferation, fibrogenesis, tissue repair, inflammation, and ventricular remodeling.

Galectin-3 associates with the primary cilium and modulates renal cyst growth in congenital polycystic kidney disease.

The functional roles of galectins in cellular response to membrane damage are rapidly expanding. It has been recently shown that galectin-3 recruits ESCRTs to damaged lysosomes so that lysosomes can be repaired.

== Clinical significance ==
=== Early neurodevelopment ===
In early murine embryogenesis, galectin-3 is known to be expressed in the trophectoderm, notochord, and embryonic macrophages, but its functions in neurodevelopment remain unclear. Details as to how galectin-3 regulates murine neurogenesis continue to evolve. In the subventricular zone (SVZ), galectin-3 was shown to be important for neuroblast migration, acting possibly through an EGFR-based mechanism. Galectin-3 has also been implicated in gliogenesis. In the postnatal ventricular subventricular zone (V-SVZ), galectin-3 expression was shown to be necessary for optimal gliogenesis, as reduced expression of galectin-3 led to a reduction in gliogenesis.

Galectin-3 expression levels also affect glia subpopulations differently. Increasing galectin-3 expression suppressed oligodendrogenesis and induced astrogenesis by virtue of BMP signaling. Galectin-3 binds BMPR1α and increases BMP signaling in the V-SVZ. Galectin-3 also binds to β-catenin, an important component of adherens junctions, potentially linking its activity to Wnt signaling pathways. Knockdown of galectin-3 increases Wnt signaling in the postnatal SVZ, furthering support for its potential involvement as a regulator or component of these pathways.

Galectin-3 expression has also been reported in stem cell niches of human and murine embryonic brain tissue, and has recently been revealed to play a role in the process of gyrification in the brain. Galectin-3 is necessary to establish apical-basal polarity (ABP) in human embryonic stem cells (hESCs) during neural differentiation, and galectin-3 inhibition disrupts the apical distribution of junctional complex proteins in vitro. In fetal brains of female mice treated with galectin-3 inhibitors, the integrity of tight junctions in the ventricular zone (VZ) was lost, leading to early delamination of neural stem cells and increased vertical divisions. Unlike humans, the cerebral cortex of lower mammalian species such as mice do not have cortical folds (see gyri and sulci), but instead have lissencephalic cortices (smooth brain). Recently, it was reported that both pharmacological inhibition and genetic deletion of galectin-3 caused sulci to appear in the developing mouse cerebral cortex.

=== Brain injury and stroke ===
Reactive glia are known to express galectin-3 in response to injury in the brain. Galectin-3 is reported as generally pro-inflammatory, and regulates angiogenesis and chemokine expression in models of stroke and disease. In mice, modified citrus pectin was shown to prevent blood-brain barrier disruption in subarachnoid hemorrhage by inhibiting galectin-3. It has also been shown that galectin-3 is necessary for vascular endothelial growth factor (VEGF)–dependent angiogenesis following mid cerebral artery occlusion stroke in mice.

=== Fibrosis ===
A correlation between galectin-3 expression levels and various types of fibrosis has been found. Galectin-3 is upregulated in cases of liver fibrosis, renal fibrosis, and idiopathic pulmonary fibrosis (IPF). In several studies with mice deficient in or lacking galectin-3, conditions that caused control mice to develop IPF, renal, or liver fibrosis either induced limited fibrosis or failed to induce fibrosis entirely. Companies have developed galectin modulators that block the binding of galectins to carbohydrate structures. The galectin-3 inhibitors, TD139 and GR-MD-02 have the potential to treat fibrosis.

=== Cardiovascular disease ===
Elevated levels of galectin-3 have been found to be significantly associated with higher risk of death in both acute decompensated heart failure and chronic heart failure populations. In normal human, murine, and rat cells galectin-3 levels are low. However, as heart disease progresses, significant upregulation of galectin-3 occurs in the myocardium.

Galectin-3 also may be used as a biomarker to identify at risk individuals, and predict patient response to different drugs and therapies. For instance, galectin-3 levels could be used in early detection of failure-prone hearts and lead to intervention strategies including broad spectrum anti-inflammatory agents. One study concluded that individuals with systolic heart failure of ischaemic origin and elevated galectin-3 levels may benefit from statin treatment. Galectin-3 has also been associated as a factor promoting ventricular remodeling following mitral valve repair, and may identify patients requiring additional therapies to obtain beneficial reverse remodeling.

=== Cancer ===
The wide variety of effects of galectin-3 on cancerous cells are due to the unique structure and various interaction properties of the molecule. Overexpression and changes in the localization of galectin-3 molecules affects the prognosis of the patient and targeting the actions of galectin-3 poses a promising therapeutic strategy for the development of effective therapeutic agents for cancer treatment.

Overexpression and changes in sub- and inter-cellular localization of galectin-3 are commonly seen in cancerous conditions. The many interaction and binding properties of galectin-3 influence various cell activities based on its location. Altered galectin-3 expression can affect cancer cell growth and differentiation, chemoattraction, apoptosis, immunosuppression, angiogenesis, adhesion, invasion and metastasis.

Galectin-3 overexpression promotes neoplastic transformation and the maintenance of transformed phenotypes as well as enhances the tumour cell's adhesion to the extracellular matrix and increase metastatic spreading. Galectin-3 can be either an inhibitory or a promoting apoptotic depending on its sub-cellular localization. In immune regulation, galectin-3 can regulate immune cell activities and helps contribute to the tumour cell's evasion of the immune system. Galectin-3 also helps promote angiogenesis.

The roles of galectins and galectin-3, in particular, in cancer have been heavily investigated. Of note, galectin-3 has been suggested to play important roles in cancer metastasis.

== Clinical applications ==
=== Cardiovascular risk indicator ===
Chronic heart failure has been found to be indicated by a galectin-3 tests, using the ARCHITECT immunochemistry platform developed by BG Medicine and marketed by Abbott, helping to determine which patients are most at risk for the disease. This test is also offered on the VIDAS platform marketed by bioMérieux. Pecta-Sol C binds to galectin-3 binding sites on the surfaces of cells as a preventative measure created by Isaac Eliaz in conjunction with EcoNugenics.

Galectin-3 is upregulated in patients with idiopathic pulmonary fibrosis. The cells that receive galectin-3 stimulation (fibroblasts, epithelial cells, and myofibroblasts) upregulated the formation of fibrosis and collagen formation. Fibrosis is necessary in many aspects of intrabody regeneration. The myocardial lining constantly undergoes necessary fibrosis, and the inhibition of galectin-3 interferes with myocardial fibrogenesis. A study concluded that pharmacological inhibition of galectin-3 attenuates cardiac fibrosis, LV dysfunction, and subsequent heart failure development.

=== Drug development ===
Galecto Biotech in Sweden is focused on developing drugs targeting galectin-3 to treat fibrosis, specifically idiopathic pulmonary fibrosis. Galectin Therapeutics in the United States is also targeting galectins for clinical applications. Preclinical studies demonstrate that inhibition of galectin-3 significantly reduces portal hypertension and fibrosis. In a phase 2b/3 trial, Galectin Therapeutics galectin-3 inhibitor belapectin reduces liver stiffness progression and prevents varices at 18 months in MASH cirrhosis.. Earlier phase 1 data for belapectin also showed increased effectiveness and reduced side effects of cancer immunotherapy.

=== Biomarkers ===
Galectin-3 is increasingly being used as a diagnostic marker for different cancers. It can be screened for and used as a prognostic factor to predict the progression of the cancer. Galectin-3 has varying effects in different types of cancer. One approach to cancers with high galectin-3 expression is to inhibit galectin-3 to enhance treatment response.

== Interactions ==
LGALS3 has been shown to interact with LGALS3BP.

In melanocytic cells LGALS3 gene expression may be regulated by MITF.
