= Membrane-type matrix metalloproteinase-1 =

Identifiers
- EC no.: 3.4.24.80
- CAS no.: 161384-17-4

Databases
- IntEnz: IntEnz view
- BRENDA: BRENDA entry
- ExPASy: NiceZyme view
- KEGG: KEGG entry
- MetaCyc: metabolic pathway
- PRIAM: profile
- PDB structures: RCSB PDB PDBe PDBsum
Search
- PMC: articles
- PubMed: articles
- NCBI: proteins

Membrane-type matrix metalloproteinase-1 (EC 3.4.24.80, matrix metalloproteinase 14) is an enzyme. This enzyme catalyses the following chemical reaction

Endopeptidase activity. Activates progelatinase A by cleavage of the propeptide at Asn^{37}-Leu. Other bonds hydrolysed include Gly35-Ile in the propeptide of collagenase 3, and Asn^{341}-Phe, Asp^{441}-Leu and Gln^{354}-Thr in the aggrecan interglobular domain

This enzyme belongs to peptidase family M10.

== See also ==
- Metalloproteinase
