= Membrane-bound protein =

A membrane-bound protein, is a protein that is bound (attached) to a biological membrane, may refer to:

- Integral membrane protein (permanently attached or built in)
- Peripheral membrane protein (temporarily attached)
