= Belapectin =

Clinical data
- Other names: GR-MD-02; Galactoarabino-rhamnogalacturonate

Legal status
- Legal status: Investigational

Identifiers
- IUPAC name: α-D-Galacturono-α-D-galacto-β-D-galacto-6-deoxy-α-L- manno-α-L-arabinan, (1→2),(1→3),(1→4)-, methyl ester
- CAS Number: 1980787-47-0; 1604015-18-0
- DrugBank: DB15125
- UNII: K7ODU55HT6

Belapectin (also known as GR-MD-02) is a galectin-3 inhibitor developed by Galectin Therapeutics for the treatment of non-alcoholic steatohepatitis. In a phase 2b/3 trial belapectin at 2 mg/kg/LBW reduces varices development in MASH cirrhosis with portal hypertension.
