= JADE1 =

Protein-coding gene in the species Homo sapiens

Identifiers
- Aliases: JADE1, PHF17, jade family PHD finger 1
- External IDs: OMIM: 610514; MGI: 1925835; GeneCards: JADE1

Gene location (Human)
Chr.	Chromosome 4 (human)
Band	4q28.2	Start	128,809,700 bp
Band	4q28.2	End	128,875,224 bp

Gene location (Mouse)
Chr.	Chromosome 3 (mouse)
Band	3|3 B	Start	41,510,166 bp
Band	3|3 B	End	41,571,299 bp
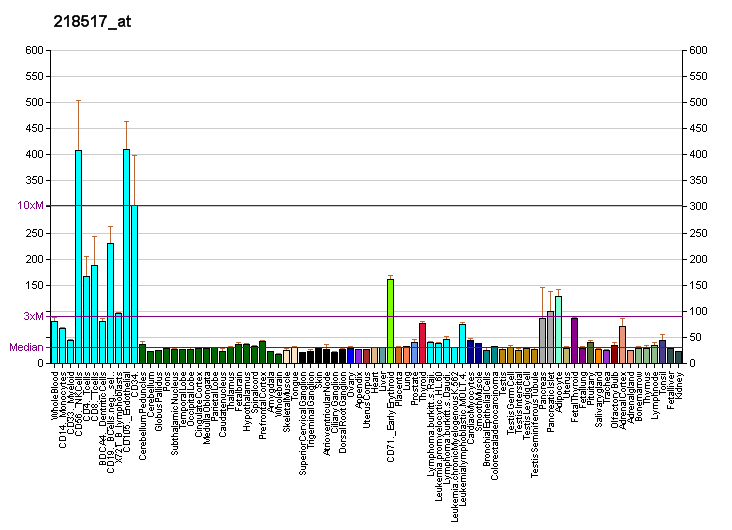

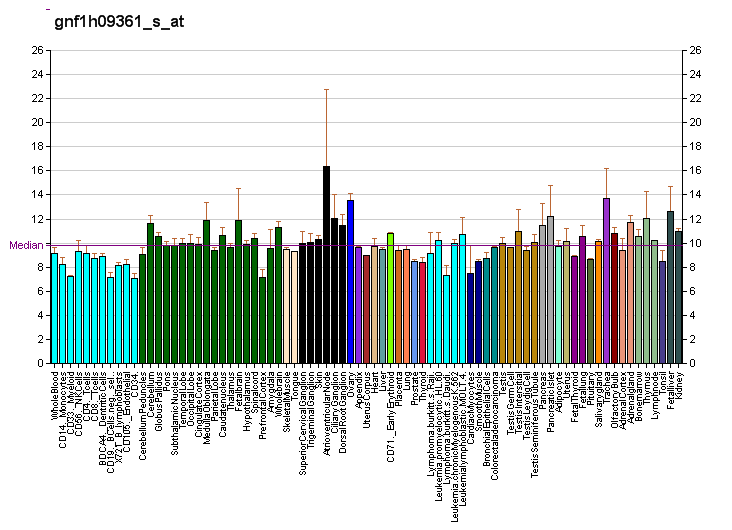

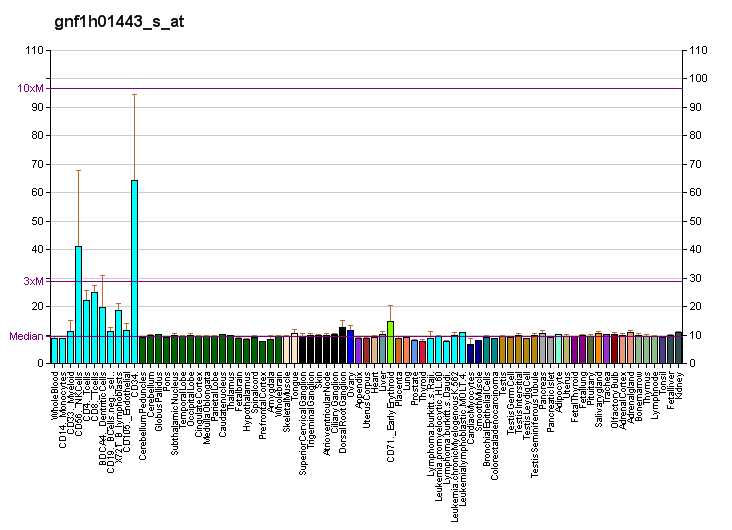
RNA expression pattern
Bgee	Human / Mouse (ortholog); Top expressed in: buccal mucosa cell; pericardium; parotid gland; ventricular zone; kidney tubule; body of pancreas; glomerulus; gastric mucosa; metanephric glomerulus; Achilles tendon / Top expressed in: lacrimal gland; gastrula; decidua; salivary gland; retinal pigment epithelium; ciliary body; parotid gland; seminal vesicula; submandibular gland; transitional epithelium of urinary bladder; More reference expression data
BioGPS	More reference expression data
Gene ontology
Molecular function	transcription coactivator activity; metal ion binding; protein binding
Cellular component	cytoplasm; cytosol; plasma membrane; nucleoplasm; histone acetyltransferase complex; nucleus; ciliary basal body; cytoskeleton; cell projection; nuclear speck
Biological process	regulation of transcription, DNA-templated; transcription, DNA-templated; histone H4-K5 acetylation; negative regulation of G1/S transition of mitotic cell cycle; negative regulation of cell growth; histone H3 acetylation; histone H4-K16 acetylation; histone H4-K8 acetylation; histone H4-K12 acetylation; apoptotic process; positive regulation of transcription by RNA polymerase II; negative regulation of canonical Wnt signaling pathway; transcription by RNA polymerase II; positive regulation of nucleic acid-templated transcription
Sources:Amigo / QuickGO
Orthologs
Databases	NCBI: entry; OMA: entry
Species	Human	Mouse
Entrez	79960	269424
Ensembl	ENSG00000077684	ENSMUSG00000025764
UniProt	Q6IE81	Q6ZPI0
RefSeq (mRNA)	NM_001287437; NM_001287439; NM_001287440; NM_001287441; NM_001287442 NM_001287443; NM_024900; NM_199320	NM_001130184; NM_001130185; NM_001130186; NM_172303
RefSeq (protein)	NP_001274366; NP_001274368; NP_001274369; NP_001274370; NP_001274371 NP_001274372; NP_079176; NP_955352	NP_001123656; NP_001123657; NP_001123658; NP_758507
Location (UCSC)	Chr 4: 128.81 – 128.88 Mb	Chr 3: 41.51 – 41.57 Mb
PubMed search
- Wikidata
View/Edit Human	View/Edit Mouse

JADE1 is a protein that in humans is encoded by the JADE1 gene.

== Family ==
A small family of proteins named Gene for Apoptosis and Differentiation (JADE) includes three members encoded by individual genes: Plant Homeo-domain-17 (PHF17, JADE1), PHF16 (JADE3), and PHF15 (JADE2). All JADE family proteins bear two notable mid molecule domains: the canonical Plant Homeo-domain (PHD) zinc finger and extended PHD-like zinc finger. JADE1 therefore is classified as a member of the PHD protein family. There are two known protein products of the PHF17 gene, the full length JADE1 (JADE1L) and its splice variant missing the C-terminal fragment also called short isoform (JADE1S).

== Discovery ==
Nagase et al. cloned and sequenced 100 individual cDNAs from fetal brain cDNA library, including clone KIAA1807 which was designated PHF17. The predicted 702-amino acid protein product of that clone was similar to the human zinc finger protein BR140 (BRPF1). Based on sequence database analysis the study suggested that PHF17 may function in nucleic acid managing pathway. Using yeast two hybrid pull down approach to search for new partners of protein product of the Von Hippel Lindau gene (pVHL) another study identified cDNA which matched to KIAA1807 clone. The protein product of that cDNA was given name JADE1 (Jade-1, PHF17). The deduced 509 amino acid long protein product of JADE1 cDNA was further confirmed as physical partner of pVHL. In a genetic screen study searching for genes involved in embryogenesis, the mouse orthologue of JADE1 was identified. That study, provided first characterization of the JADE1 gene and defined novel JADE family. The study yielded mice with knock out of JADE1 gene.

Jade1 transcripts in both humans and mice undergo alternative splicing and polyadenylation producing two major transcripts, the full length 6 kb mRNA and 3.6 kb mRNA. Two resultant protein products of the JADE1 gene were designated JADE1S for the short (which is same as(3)) and JADE1L for the long isoform. Several minor transcripts are also detected. The database analysis revealed two additional JADE1 paralogues and members of JADE family, JADE2, and JADE3. JADE3 is identical to E9 protein identified in an earlier independent study which suggested role in apoptosis for PHF16/JADE3/E9 in breast cancer cells.

JADE1 has been mapped to chromosome 4 (4q26-q27). JADE1 is conserved and its orthologues have been found or predicted in most every metazoan. Gene structure and sequences, variants, conservation, orthologues and paralogs, JADE1 phylogenetic tree and large scale screening of JADE1 tissue expression can be found in several extensive databases (https://www.genecards.org; http://useast.ensembl.org).

== Structure ==
The full length JADE1 polypeptide bears one canonical and one extended PHD zinc finger domain. Other domains include the N-terminal candidate PEST domain, enhancer of polycomb-like domain and the C-terminal nuclear localization (NLS) signal (prosite.expasy.org). JADE1 protein is a target for post translational modifications, including phosphorylation (Fig 1

Figure 1. Mass Spec (red and green) and in silico (black) analysis of JADE1 phosphorylation sites.

Six amino acid residues were identified to be phosphorylated in cell cycle-dependent manner via Aurora A kinase pathway. JADE1 is a target of phosphorylation by Casein kinase 2 (CK2). In addition, multiple phosphorylation sites are found by high throughput screening approaches and in silico analysis. Summary schematic for JADE1L and JADE1S protein phosphorylation sites with references is found in.

Proteins bearing tandem canonical and extended PHD fingers form a small subfamily within the large PHD protein family (www.genenames.org). Other proteins bearing tandem of PHD fingers and related to JADE1 include proteins that are components of chromatin binding and modifying complexes BRPF1, BRPF3 and BRD1. The crystal structure of JADE1 PHD domains has not been solved. Canonical PHD finger motif has signature C4HC3, represents relatively small, stable structure, and is distinct from the C3HC4 type RING finger. PHD domains are able to recognize and bind specific methylated lysine of histone H3, which defines these domains as epigenetic histone code readers. Reviews describing structure and properties of PHD fingers in depth are available.

== Cellular function ==
JADE1 proteins are multifunctional and interact with several protein partners.

=== Histone acetylation ===
Function of JADE1 in histone acetylation and transcription activation which required the second extended PHD zinc finger was reported in 2004(16). JADE1 dramatically increases levels of acetylated histone H4 within chromatin, but not histone H3, a specificity characteristic to the MYST family HAT TIP60 and HBO1. TIP60 physically associates with JADE1 and augments JADE1 HAT function in live cells. TIP60 and JADE1 mutually stabilized each other. Transcriptional and HAT activities of JADE1 require PHD2. Results suggest the chromatin targeting role for JADE1 PHD2. In addition, PHD2 of JADE1 binds the N-terminal tail of histone H3 within chromatin context irrespective of methylation status.

Studies analyzing native complexes of INhibitor of Growth (ING) PHD finger family of proteins revealed that ING4 and ING5 proteins are associated with JADE1S and HAT HBO1, while ING3 is associated with EPC1 (JADE1 homolog), TIP60 (HBO1 homolog) and several other partners. Both complexes also included a small Eaf6 protein. The biochemical and in silico analysis of complexes formed by HBO1 and TIP60 suggested common architecture and supported the role for JADE1 in bulk histone H4 acetylation. Characterization of JADE1 and HBO1 functional interactions show structural and functional similarities between the complexes(16, 19). Similarly to TIP60, JADE1 and HBO1 mutually stabilize each other. JADE1 binds to and enables HBO1 to enhance global histone H4 acetylation, which requires intact PHD2 finger. Similarly to HBO1, JADE1 is responsible for bulk histone H4 acetylation in cultured cells. H4K5, H4K12, and most likely H4K8 are targets of JADE1-dependent acetylation in cultured cells and in vivo. Several potential transcription targets of JADE1 have been suggested from experiments using screening approaches. According to screening genomic analysis done by ChIP-chip assay JADE1L complex is found mainly along the coding regions of many genes and JADE1L abundance correlates mostly with H3K36me3 histone mark. JADE1L over expression correlates with increased quantities of H4acK8 in the coding region of many genes. The two PHD zinc fingers of JADE1 appear to bind preferentially non-methylated N-terminal peptide of histone. JADE1 isoforms assemble at least two different complexes, JADE1L-HBO1-ING4/5 and JADE1S-HBO1 complex. Due to the lack of the C-terminal fragment, JADE1S is incapable of binding ING4/5 partners. A small less characterized protein Eaf6 is also another component of JADE1 complexes.

=== Cell cycle ===
Acetylation of N-terminal fragments of bulk histone H4 has been known to correlate with DNA synthesis and cell division. Several studies support cell cycle role for JADE1 linked to HBO1 pathway. Both, JADE1 and HBO1 are independently required for the acetylation of bulk histone H4 in cultured cells. The depletion of JADE1 proteins by siRNA results in 1) decreased levels of histone H4 bulk acetylation; 2) slower rates of DNA synthesis in cultured cells; 3) decreased levels of the total and chromatin-bound HBO1; 4) abrogation of chromatin recruitment of MCM7. Agreeing with these results, JADE1L over-expression increases chromatin-bound MCM3 protein. The effects of JADE1 depletion on DNA replication events are similar to those described originally for HBO1 and suggests adaptor role for JADE1 in HBO1-mediated cell cycle regulation.

JADE1 role in DNA damage has been suggested. A recently discovered non-coding RNA lncRNA-JADE regulates JADE1 expression and provides a functional link between the DNA damage response (DDR) and bulk histone H4 acetylation. Results support role in DNA synthesis linked to histone H4 acetylation. In cultured cells knock down of lncRNA-JADE increased cells sensitivity to DNA damaging drugs. In mice tumor xenograft model, the knock down of lncRNA-JADE inhibited xenograft mammary tumor growth. In a pilot human study, higher levels of lncRNA-JADE as well as JADE1 protein were detected in breast cancer tissues compared to normal tissues. Lastly, the higher levels of JADE1 protein inversely correlated with survival rates of patients with breast cancer. The study suggests that lncRNA-JADE might contribute to breast tumorigenesis, and that JADE1 protein mediates at least part of this effect. JADE1 and cytokinesis. JADE1S negatively regulates cytokinesis of the epithelial cell cycle, a function specific to the small isoform. First report that suggested JADE1 function in G2/M/G1 transition showed that during the late G2 phase, JADE1S undergoes phosphorylation linked to its dissociation from chromatin into the cytoplasm. Mass Spectral analysis identified that total of six individual amino acid residues are phosphorylated by a mitotic kinase. Based on pharmacological analysis, JADE1 phosphorylation and compartmentalization is regulated by Aurora A and Aurora B pathways. Other kinases have been reported and may play a role. Upon completion of mitosis around telophase, the main pool of the JADE1S protein undergoes de-phosphorylation and re-associates with apparently condensing chromatin inside the reformed nuclei. A discrete pool of JADE1S associates with the cleavage furrow and subsequently appears in the midbody of the cytokinetic bridge. Only JADE1S, but not JADE1L or HBO1 was found in the midbody of the cells undergoing cytokinesis. The spatial regulation of JADE1S during the cell division suggested role in G2/M to G1 transition, which includes cytokinesis and final abscission. Cytokinesis is the final step of cell cycle which controls fidelity of division of cellular content, including cytoplasm, membrane, and chromatin. Cytokinetic bridge is severed during the final abscission which occurs near the midbody and may take up to 2 hours. Cytokinesis and final abscission are tightly controlled by regulatory protein complexes and checkpoint proteins. The number of reports concerning cytokinesis control has been growing over the past decade.

JADE1 role in cytokinesis was demonstrated by use of several functional assays and cell culture models. DNA profiling by FACS showed that JADE1S depletion facilitated rates of G1-cells accumulation in synchronously dividing HeLa cells. The depletion of JADE1S protein in asynchronously dividing cells decreased the proportion of cytokinetic cells, and increased the proportion of multi-nuclear cells. The data demonstrated that JADE1 negatively controls cytokinesis, presumably by contributing to cytokinesis delay. JADE1 down-regulation increased number of multi-nuclear cells indicative of failed cytokinesis, while JADE1S moderate overexpression augmented the number of cytokinetic cells indicative of cytokinetic delay. Inhibition of Aurora B kinase by specific small molecule drugs resulted in the release of JADE1S-mediated cytokinetic delay and allowed progression of abscission. Since Aurora B is a key regulator of the NoCut, JADE1S is likely to regulate cytokinesis at the abscission checkpoint control. JADE1S but not JADE1L or HBO1 was found in centrosomes of dividing cells throughout the cell cycle, and neither of these proteins was found in cilia. In contrast, another study reported JADE1 localization to the cilia and centrosome. The study did not communicate on JADE1 isoform specificity. Centrosomes are the cytoskeleton nucleation centers. Centrosome signaling contributes to the definition of cell shape, motility, orientation, polarity, division plane and to the fidelity of sister chromosome separation during mitosis and cytokinesis.

=== pVHL ===
The first protein partner of JADE1S has been identified in 2002 in a study searching for new partners of the pVHL, which is a tumor suppressor. A few follow up studies characterized binding and provided some insights on functional interactions of JADE1-pVHL. The human pVHL is mutated in von Hippel–Lindau hereditary disease, and in majority of sporadic clear cell renal carcinomas. Properties and function of pVHL have been investigated for many decades and extensive literature is available. One of the better known functions of pVHL is to mediate protein ubiquitination and proteasomal degradation. As a component of ubiquitin ligase E3 complex pVHL binds and targets several known factors, including HIF1a and HIF2a for ubiquitination. Mechanism of HIF1a activation by hypoxia and role of pVHL in this pathway has been reported over a decade ago. The VHL protein has been intensely studied and the link of naturally occurring mutations to cancers established. Other causative HIF-1a-independent pVHL pathways have been considered. The pVHL-JADE1S physical interaction was identified by yeast-two hybrid screening analysis and was further confirmed biochemically. Co-transfection of pVHL increased JADE1S protein half-life and abundance, suggesting potential positive relationship. Certain pVHL cancer-derived truncations but not point mutations diminished pVHL-JADE1 stabilization function, suggesting link to pVHL-associated cancers. Molecular pathways and cellular significance of JADE1-pVHL interactions are not well understood. Single study describing JADE1S intrinsic ubiquitin-ligase activity and ubiquitination of beta-catenin has been reported in year 2008. Based on that study a model has been proposed that pVHL regulates beta-catenin through JADE1, and PHD zinc fingers are required for this activity.

=== Apoptosis ===
JADE1S function in apoptosis has been proposed but the mechanisms remain elusive and results are hard to reconcile. According to studies, JADE1 overexpression slows rates of cellular growth and induces cell cycle arrest protein p21. Several attempts to establish dependable cell lines stably expressing JADE1S protein have not been successful, presumably due to the negative cells self-selection. Contrary to that, another study shows that JADE1 downregulation decreased rates of DNA synthesis in synchronously dividing cells. According to indirect immunofluorescence and microscopy analysis of cultured cells, cultured cells overload with JADE1 protein causes cell toxicity and side effects. Cells undergo morphological changes that do not resemble apoptosis but suggest severely impaired cell cycle including dyeing cells with abnormal shapes and large, multi-lobular nuclei. Based on JADE1S-mediated regulation of cell cycle other interpretations are considered: JADE1 overload might cause prolonged NoCut and stalled cytokinesis or severe cell cycle misbalance rather than direct transcription activation of apoptosis.

== Biological role ==
The biological role of JADE1 has not been elucidated. Limited number of publications addresses this question using mice models. The most comprehensive study which was published in 2003, identified mice orthologue of human JADE1, Jade1, and investigated Jade1 expression during mice embryogenesis. Searching for developmentally regulated genes the authors used gene trap screen analysis and identified mouse Jade1 as gene strongly regulated during embryogenesis. Insertion of the vector into the third intron of the Jade1 gene lead to the production of a 47-amino-acid truncated protein. The gene trap insertional mutation resulted in Jade1-beta-galactosidase reporter fusion product and Jade1 null allele. While the homozygotes for the gene trap integration did not produce strong developmental phenotype, the fusion product revealed Jade1 gene spatial-temporal expression in mouse embryonic cells and tissues of developing embryo up to 15.5-d.p.c. In addition the study reports experimental and in silico comparative analysis of Jade1 mRNA transcripts, Jade1 gene structure and analysis of Jade1 protein orthologues from mouse human and zebra fish. Jade1 expression was detected in extraembryonic ectoderm and trophoblast, which are placental components important for vasculogenesis, as well as in sites enriched with multipotent or tissue-specific progenitors, including neural progenitors(2). The dynamics of Jade1 reporter expression in these areas indicates the involvement in the determination and elongation of anterior posterior axis, an important point of the study). The potential role for human JADE1 in the renewal of embryonic stem cell and embryonal carcinoma cell cultures was suggested in another screening study which showed that, in cultured stem cells activation of stem cell transcription factor OCT4 pathway upregulated JADE1 gene expression along with stem cell factors NANOG, PHC1, USP44 and SOX2. Role of JADE1 in epithelial cell proliferation was addressed in a murine model of acute kidney injury and regeneration. Expression patterns and dynamics of HBO1-JADE1S/L were examined in regenerating tubular epithelial cells. Ischemia and reperfusion injury resulted in an initial decrease in JADE1S, JADE1L, and HBO1 protein levels, which returned to the baseline during renal recovery. Expression levels of HBO1 and JADE1S recovered as cell proliferation rate reached maximum, whereas JADE1L recovered after bulk proliferation had diminished. The temporal expression of JADE1 correlated with the acetylation of histone H4 (H4K5 and H4K12) but not that of histone H3 (H4K14), suggesting that the JADE1-HBO1 complex specifically marks H4 during epithelial cell proliferation. The results of the study implicate JADE1-HBO1 complex in acute kidney injury and suggest distinct roles for JADE1 isoforms during epithelial cell recovery.

== Disease associations ==
Role of JADE1 in human disease has not been elucidated. A recent study searched for novel submicroscopic genetic changes in myelofibrosis, which is a bone marrow cancer. The study identified seven novel deletions and translocations in small cohort of patients with primary myelofibrosis. JADE1 and the adjacent gene called Sodium channel and clathrin linker 1 (SCLT1) were significantly modified. As a result of mutation, JADE1 gene has deletions of intron 5-6 and exons 6–11, which would produce JADE1 missing a large chunk of protein starting from the PHD zinc finger. The relevance to pathogenesis is under investigation. In a handful of pilot studies JADE1 expression was examined in colon cancers and renal carcinomas. The results in these studies do not always reconcile. The results of some studies are generated mostly from the histochemical analysis of tumor specimens using JADE1 antibody with uncharacterized specificities towards JADE1 in general, and JADE1S or JADE1L in particular. Results of study using in silico microarray algorithm analysis shows, that PHF17 mRNA may play a role in the development of pancreatic cancer. These promising lines of investigations require further controls and additional assessments.

== Interactions ==
Several proteins interact with JADE1, including: pVHL, TIP60, HBO1, ING4, ING5, β-catenin, NPHP4.
