= BCL9L =

Protein-coding gene in the species Homo sapiens

Identifiers
- Aliases: BCL9L, BCL9-2, DLNB11, B-cell CLL/lymphoma 9-like, B-cell CLL/lymphoma 9 like, B cell CLL/lymphoma 9 like, B9L, BCL9 like
- External IDs: OMIM: 609004; MGI: 1933114; GeneCards: BCL9L
Available structures
PDB	Ortholog search: PDBe RCSB
PDB	List of PDB id codes 2XB1, 4UP0, 4UP5

Gene location (Human)
Chr.	Chromosome 11 (human)
Band	11q23.3	Start	118,893,875 bp
Band	11q23.3	End	118,925,926 bp

Gene location (Mouse)
Chr.	Chromosome 9 (mouse)
Band	9|9 A5.2	Start	44,394,122 bp
Band	9|9 A5.2	End	44,423,193 bp
RNA expression pattern
Bgee	Human / Mouse (ortholog); Top expressed in: granulocyte; right coronary artery; stromal cell of endometrium; right uterine tube; gastric mucosa; popliteal artery; tibial arteries; mucosa of ileum; right ovary; nipple / Top expressed in: basilar part of occipital bone; splanchnocranium; sphenoid bone; thyroid cartilage; basisphenoid; Meckel's cartilage; rib; lip; hyoid bone; Rostral migratory stream; More reference expression data
BioGPS	n/a
Gene ontology
Molecular function	transcription coactivator activity; beta-catenin binding
Cellular component	nucleolus; nucleus; nucleoplasm; beta-catenin-TCF complex
Biological process	regulation of cell morphogenesis; regulation of transcription, DNA-templated; negative regulation of transforming growth factor beta receptor signaling pathway; positive regulation of epithelial to mesenchymal transition; transcription, DNA-templated; beta-catenin-TCF complex assembly; canonical Wnt signaling pathway; somatic stem cell population maintenance; skeletal muscle cell differentiation; positive regulation of transcription by RNA polymerase II
Sources:Amigo / QuickGO
Orthologs
Databases	NCBI: entry; OMA: entry
Species	Human	Mouse
Entrez	283149	80288
Ensembl	ENSG00000186174	ENSMUSG00000063382
UniProt	Q86UU0	Q67FY2
RefSeq (mRNA)	NM_182557; NM_001378213; NM_001378214	NM_030256; NM_001357490
RefSeq (protein)	NP_872363; NP_001365142; NP_001365143	NP_084532; NP_001344419
Location (UCSC)	Chr 11: 118.89 – 118.93 Mb	Chr 9: 44.39 – 44.42 Mb
PubMed search
- Wikidata
View/Edit Human	View/Edit Mouse

B-cell CLL/lymphoma 9 like is a protein that in humans is encoded by the BCL9L gene.
