= MDIA =

MDIA may refer to:

- mDia, or mammalian diaphanous, a Rho effector protein involved in cytoskeletal polymerisation (see DIAPH1)
- Men's Division of Intercollegiate Associates, now called the Men's Collegiate Lacrosse Association
