= GTPase-activator protein for Ras-like GTPase =

Protein family

Identifiers
- Symbol: RasGAP
- Pfam: PF00616
- InterPro: IPR001936
- SMART: RasGAP
- SCOP2: 1wer / SCOPe / SUPFAM
- CDD: cd04519
Available protein structures:
- PDB: 1nf1A:1256-1451 1wer :769-942 1wq1G:769-942 IPR001936 PF00616 (ECOD; PDBsum)
- AlphaFold: IPR001936; PF00616

GTPase-activator protein for Ras-like GTPase is a family of evolutionarily related proteins. Ras proteins are membrane-associated molecular switches that bind GTP and GDP and slowly hydrolyze GTP to GDP. This intrinsic GTPase activity of ras is stimulated by a family of proteins collectively known as 'GAP' or GTPase-activating proteins. As it is the GTP bound form of ras which is active, these proteins are said to be down-regulators of ras.

The Ras GTPase-activating proteins are quite large (from 765 residues for sar1 to 3079 residues for IRA2) but share only a limited (about 250 residues) region of sequence similarity, referred to as the 'catalytic domain' or rasGAP domain.

Note: There are distinctly different GAPs for the rap and rho/rac subfamilies of ras-like proteins (reviewed in reference) that do not share sequence similarity with ras GAPs.

== Examples ==
Human genes encoding proteins containing this domain include:

- DAB2IP;
- GAPVD1;
- IQGAP1; IQGAP2; IQGAP3;
- NF1;
- RASA1; RASA2; RASA3; RASA4; RASAL1; RASAL2;
- SYNGAP1;
