= IQ motif containing GTPase activating protein =

Protein family

IQ motif containing GTPase activating proteins (IQGAPs) are a family of scaffold proteins involved in the regulation of the cytoskeleton.

They are associated with Rho GTP-binding proteins.

== Genes ==
- IQGAP1, IQGAP2, IQGAP3

== See also ==
- IQ calmodulin-binding motif
