= IQGAP1 =

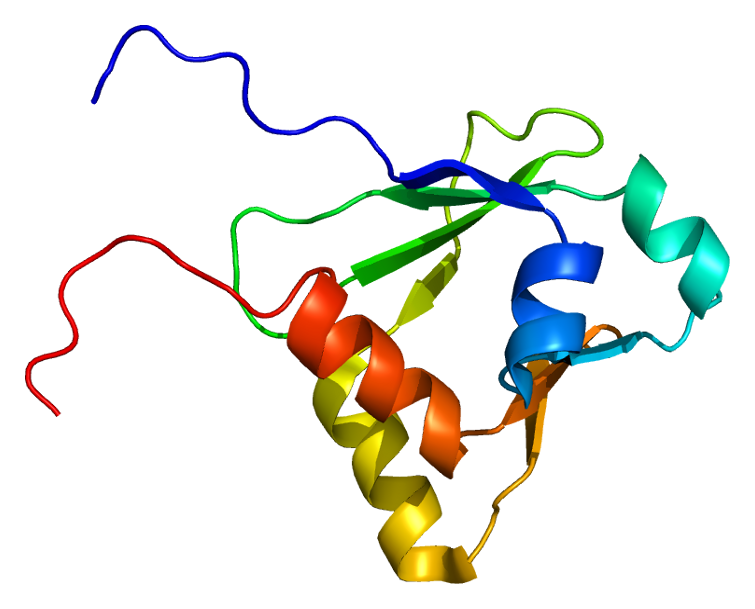

Identifiers
- Aliases: IQGAP1, HUMORFA01, SAR1, p195, IQ motif containing GTPase activating protein 1
- External IDs: OMIM: 603379; MGI: 1352757; GeneCards: IQGAP1
Available structures
PDB	Ortholog search: PDBe RCSB
PDB	List of PDB id codes 1X0H, 2RR8, 3FAY, 3I6X

Gene location (Human)
Chr.	Chromosome 15 (human)
Band	15q26.1	Start	90,388,242 bp
Band	15q26.1	End	90,502,239 bp

Gene location (Mouse)
Chr.	Chromosome 7 (mouse)
Band	7 D3|7 45.68 cM	Start	80,361,331 bp
Band	7 D3|7 45.68 cM	End	80,475,722 bp
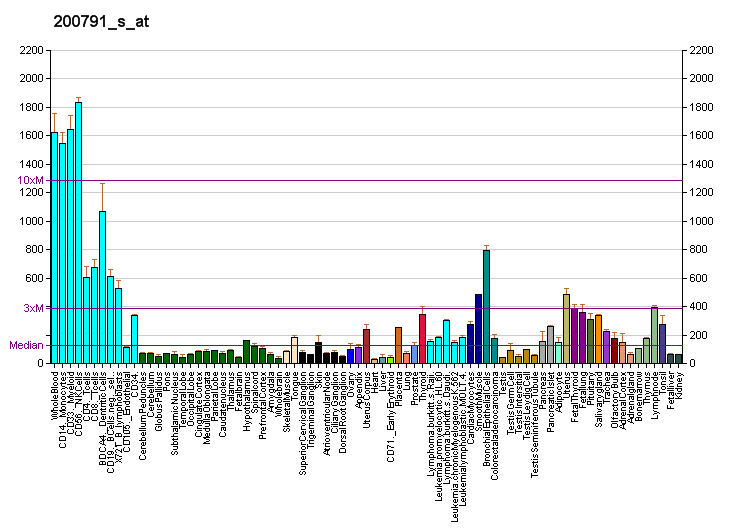

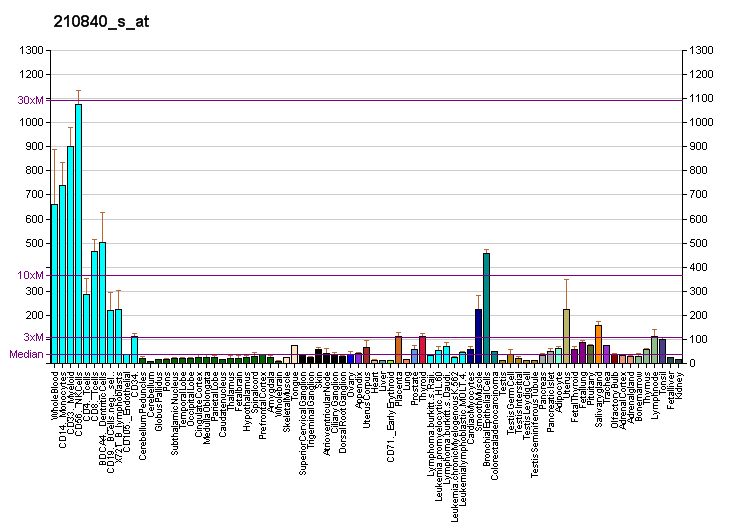

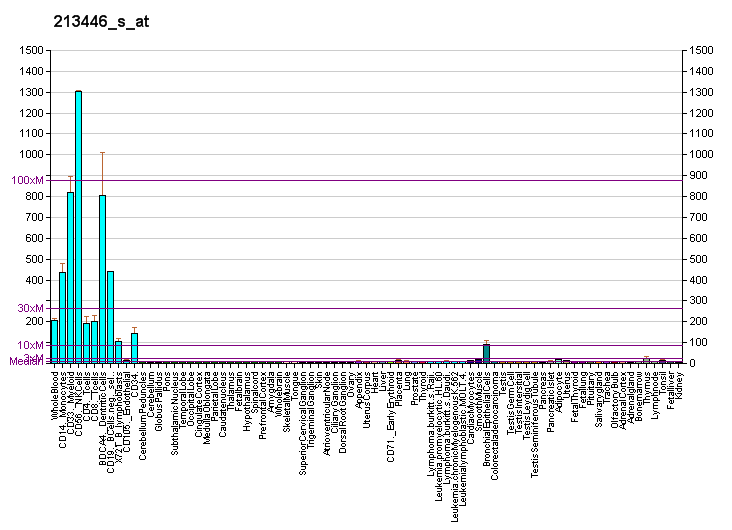
RNA expression pattern
Bgee	Human / Mouse (ortholog); Top expressed in: Achilles tendon; epithelium of colon; monocyte; skin of hip; skin of thigh; right coronary artery; body of uterus; secondary oocyte; Descending thoracic aorta; lower lobe of lung / Top expressed in: left lung lobe; right lung lobe; left colon; stria vascularis; tibiofemoral joint; vestibular membrane of cochlear duct; corneal stroma; granulocyte; conjunctival fornix; carotid body; More reference expression data
BioGPS	More reference expression data
Gene ontology
Molecular function	calcium ion binding; S100 protein binding; protein domain specific binding; protein-containing complex binding; protein serine/threonine kinase activator activity; GTPase inhibitor activity; protein binding; protein phosphatase binding; protein kinase binding; phosphatidylinositol-3,4,5-trisphosphate binding; GTPase activator activity; mitogen-activated protein kinase binding; cadherin binding; calmodulin binding; small GTPase binding; molecular adaptor activity
Cellular component	cytoplasm; cytosol; lateral plasma membrane; cell-cell junction; membrane; microtubule cytoskeleton; growth cone; ruffle; extrinsic component of cytoplasmic side of plasma membrane; plasma membrane; slit diaphragm; axon; midbody; cell leading edge; actin filament; actin cytoskeleton; neuron projection; cytoplasmic ribonucleoprotein granule; microtubule; extracellular exosome; membrane raft; nucleus; focal adhesion; secretory granule membrane; protein-containing complex; ribonucleoprotein complex
Biological process	cellular response to calcium ion; glomerular visceral epithelial cell development; epidermal growth factor receptor signaling pathway; negative regulation of dephosphorylation; regulation of GTPase activity; cellular response to platelet-derived growth factor stimulus; cellular response to fibroblast growth factor stimulus; neuron projection extension; cellular response to epidermal growth factor stimulus; regulation of cytokine production; fibroblast growth factor receptor signaling pathway; platelet-derived growth factor receptor signaling pathway; signal transduction; positive regulation of protein kinase activity; positive regulation of focal adhesion assembly; positive regulation of peptidyl-tyrosine autophosphorylation; positive regulation of GTPase activity; positive regulation of protein localization; positive regulation of dendrite development; positive regulation of MAP kinase activity; positive regulation of vascular associated smooth muscle cell migration; negative regulation of GTPase activity; response to angiotensin; neutrophil degranulation; regulation of mitotic cell cycle; cell migration; viral process
Sources:Amigo / QuickGO
Orthologs
Databases	NCBI: entry; OMA: entry
Species	Human	Mouse
Entrez	8826	29875
Ensembl	ENSG00000140575	ENSMUSG00000030536
UniProt	P46940	Q9JKF1
RefSeq (mRNA)	NM_003870	NM_016721
RefSeq (protein)	NP_003861	NP_057930
Location (UCSC)	Chr 15: 90.39 – 90.5 Mb	Chr 7: 80.36 – 80.48 Mb
PubMed search
- Wikidata
View/Edit Human	View/Edit Mouse

Ras GTPase-activating-like protein IQGAP1 (IQGAP1) also known as p195 is a ubiquitously expressed protein that in humans is encoded by the IQGAP1 gene. IQGAP1 is a scaffold protein involved in regulating various cellular processes ranging from organization of the actin cytoskeleton, transcription, and cellular adhesion to regulating the cell cycle.

== History ==
IQGAP1 was discovered in 1994. Its name stems from the fact that its RasGAP-related domain (GRD) has sequence homology to the Sar1 GTPase. It was hypothesized that IQGAP1 would act as a GTPase activating protein (GAP) protein, promoting the switch of ras GTPases from the active GTP to GDP-bound forms. However, despite the homology of IQGAP’s GAP domain to sar1 and the fact that IQGAP1 binds Rho GTPases Rac1 and Cdc42, IQGAP does not actually have GAP function. Instead, it binds the active (GTP-bound) forms of RAC1 and CDC42 with higher affinity than GDP-bound forms, and stabilizes the active form in vivo.

IQGAP1 is now recognized as a protein scaffold that integrates signals regulating cell adhesion, actin cytoskeleton, the cell cycle, and other cellular functions. IQGAP is particularly interesting as a therapeutic target since it acts as a node for so many signaling pathways implicated in cancer progression.

== Expression ==
Analysis of IQGAP1 expression in human tissues has indicated that the scaffold is more or less ubiquitously expressed. It is usually found in the nucleus, plasma membrane, and cytoplasm. In other words it is found throughout the cell as well as throughout tissue types. Expression analysis has also indicated that IQGAP1 is overexpressed in many cancers, and in more aggressive colorectal and ovarian cancers, IQGAP1 is localized at the invasive front of the neoplasm, indicating a role in mobilization of the cells. Importantly, approximately 10% of genes that show increased expression in metastatic cells are IQGAP1 binding partners.

== Domains ==
IQGAP1 is a 190 kDa protein with 5 domains. A protein domain is a subsection of a protein that shows up multiple times in biology and can exist independently of the surrounding protein. It is very similar to subsections of other proteins, and could be cut out of the current protein, exist and function by itself, or be pasted in to a new protein strand and still function properly. Since this area of the protein is conserved in amino acid sequence and structure, it can be characterized by function or binding partner. IQGAP1 has 5 well-known domains separated by other amino acids.

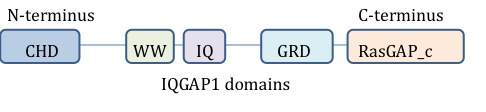
IQGAP1 protein

Starting at the N-terminus (or front of the protein), IQGAP1 contains a calponin homology domain (CHD), which mediates actin-binding and binds calponin.

The WW, or poly-proline protein-protein domain, so named because of two functionally conserved tryptophans, W, is a protein-protein interaction domain that associates with proline-rich regions of other proteins.

The WW domain is followed by 4 IQ motifs which form an IQ domain. This domain binds calmodulin, a protein known as a calcium sensor that can bind and regulate many target proteins.

A GRD (rasGAP-related domain) follows the IQ domain. This domain is highly similar to the functional subunit of Ras GTPase-activating proteins (GAPs) and was thus thought to have GAP function. IQGAP1 does bind Rho GTPases CDC42 and RAC1, however, IQGAP1 is unusual in that it actually has no GAP function, and instead stabilizes the GTP-bound proteins in their active state.

Finally, IQGAP1 has a RasGAP_c carboxy terminal sequence important for binding Beta-catenin and E-cadherin.

== Related Proteins ==
Homologues of IQGAP1 are known in species as divergent as yeast, worms, and humans (as well as other mammals), though the domains are not always highly conserved.

IQGAP1 is the most well studied member of the IQGAP family of scaffold proteins. The two other members of the family include IQGAP2 and IQGAP3 which have far more restricted expression patterns in comparison with IQGAP1. IQGAP2 is found in the liver, stomach, and platelets and is 62% identical to IQGAP1, but appears to have a drastically divergent function in terms of pathology.

In the brain, IQGAP3 appears to play an important role in neuronal morphogenesis.

== Function ==
This gene encodes a member of the IQGAP family. The protein contains four IQ domains, one calponin homology domain, one Ras-GAP domain and one WW domain. It interacts with components of the cytoskeleton such as the formin Dia1 (mDia1), with cell adhesion molecules (CAMs), and with several signaling molecules to regulate cell morphology and motility. For example, IQGAP1 expression is necessary for neuronal process outgrowth on the cell adhesion molecule PTPmu (PTPRM). Expression of the protein is upregulated by gene amplification in two gastric cancer cell lines and its over-expression and distinct membrane localisation is also observed in a range of tumours.

== Interactions ==
IQGAP1 is a node intersected by many signaling pathways. As such it has many binding partners, many of which have essential roles in control of the cell cycle and actin cytoskeleton.

IQGAP1 has been shown to interact with:

- Calmodulin 1,
- CDC42,
- CDH1,
- CLIP1,
- PRKACA,
- RAC1, and
- S100B.
- Actin – cytoskeletal structure
- ARF6
- APC
- Beta-catenin–cell adhesion and WNT signaling: transcription
- B-raf – MAPK pathway
- CD44
- Erk1/2 – MAPK pathway, cell cycle control, proliferation
- Mek ½ -- MAPK pathway, cell cycle control, proliferation
- Src
- PTPmu (PTPRM)
- complete list at

== Function as a Scaffold ==
Protein binding does not by itself construct an interesting story. Far more important is the outcome of the binding event. Does binding change the target protein’s localization? Does it activate the target, or in some way change the target (or effector molecule’s) conformation? As a scaffolding protein, IQGAP1 binds and regulates many targets—its role is to integrate and mediate signaling from diverse pathways and insulate key pathway members from crosstalk.

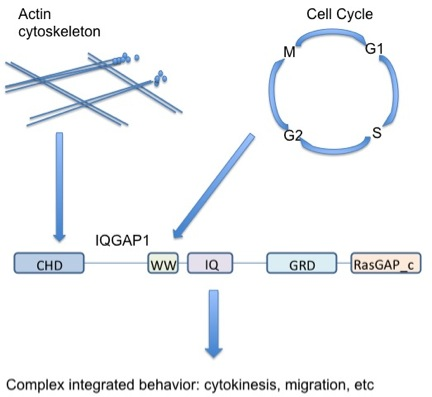
IQGAP1 integrates diverse signaling pathways.

Scaffolds organize signaling pathways—help regulate how various extracellular signals can be transduced by the same canonical pathway members into various cellular outputs. Generally, scaffolds regulate output, localization, and selectivity of pathways.

As a scaffold involved in different signaling pathways (actin cytoskeleton, cellular adhesion, cell cycle, transcription), IQGAP1 has a unique ability to potentially couple diverse cellular functions. For example IQGAP1 is associated with actin dynamics through direct binding of actin and indirect regulation via Cdc42/Rac1, but also modulates the MAPK pathway which is associated with cell cycle control. Thus IQGAP1 may couple MAPK signaling (decisions about cell fate) to the cytoskeleton or cellular adhesion (potentially acting out those decisions)—an important implication for cancer.

To simplify, due to its diverse range of binding partners, IQGAP1 may act as a link between logically related but molecularly distinct cellular functions. In the above example, actin cytoskeleton rearrangement is required for proliferation (cytokinesis during mitosis). IQGAP1 helps cells both listen to and act on signals, playing an integral role in connecting the dots between signals for proliferation and the actual cellular response.

== Key pathways ==
=== ERK MAPK ===
The Ras→Raf→MEK→ERK MAPK signaling pathway plays an integral part in the processes of cell proliferation, differentiation, and apoptosis. This pathway is conserved across all eukaryotes.

Various extracellular signals induce the ERK MAPK pathway including EGF, IGF-1, PDGF, and NGF. The various scaffolds of this pathway, including IQGAP1, are responsible for modulating the cellular response to the activity of this pathway. For instance, in a given cell line, activation by one extracellular signal may induce differentiation but not proliferation, while activation of the same ERK MAPK pathway by a different extracellular signal will induce proliferation but not differentiation. IQGAP1 seems to be responsible for the specific output of the pathway upon activation by EGF.

IQGAP1 plays a significant role in the propagation of this MAPK signaling pathway. IQGAP directly binds b-RAF, MEK1/2 and ERK1/2, and is in fact necessary for the phosphorylation (activation) of ERK upon stimulation by EGF.

=== Cytoskeletal control (actin dynamics) ===
Actin is a major building block of every eukaryotic cell’s cytoskeleton. Actin dynamics play a major role in cell motility (filaments are built at the leading edge of a moving cell and deconstructed at the receding edge). IQGAP1 binds actin and influences actin dynamics by localizing to the leading edge and recruiting actin polymerization machinery.

IQGAP1 binds and is a target of the Rho GTPases CDC42 and RAC1 which are well known regulators of the actin cytoskeleton. Despite its name, IQGAP1 does not have GAP function, and instead stabilizes active Cdc42. This increase in a local pool of active Cdc42 stimulates actin filament formation and thus filopodia formation.

IQGAP1 can crosslink actin, and in many organisms, IQGAP1 is involved in cytokinesis.

=== Adhesion ===
Cadherins are a family of adhesion proteins that localize to the cell surface where they anchor a cell to its neighbors by clasping on to the extracellular portion of the neighbor’s cadherins. Actin binds a-catenin which binds beta-catenin which in turn binds E-cadherin. E-cadherin juts into the extracellular space to grasp the extracellular domains of neighboring E-cadherins. IQGAP1 localizes to cell-cell contacts and binds actin, b-catenin, and E-cadherin, weakening these junctions and thus decreasing cell-cell adhesion. IQGAP weakens cell adhesion by displacing a-catenin from the complex.

Active RAC1 binds IQGAP1 to crosslink actin filaments and prevents IQGAP1 from interacting with beta-catenin, stabilizing cell-cell contacts. When IQGAP1 does not bind Rac1, however, it binds beta-catenin, displacing a-catenin from the cadherin-catenin cellular adhesion complex.

=== Transcription ===
IQGAP1 also affects transcription through the Wnt signaling pathway by its interaction with beta-catenin. Beta-catenin is usually sequestered in a complex and excluded from the nucleus, but upon WNT activation this complex is broken and beta-catenin translocates to the nucleus where it activates transcriptional programs. IQGAP1 binds b-catenin and increases nuclear localization and expression of beta-catenin’s transcriptional targets.

== Clinical significance ==
IQGAP1 is associated with cytoskeletal dynamics, transcription, cell adhesion, cell cycle, and morphology, all of which are disrupted in cancer. As a modulatory protein intersecting all of these pathways, IQGAP1 can couple many of them, and is also responsible for their proper propagation. Since cancer is a disease characterized by the perturbation of many of these cellular processes, IQGAP1 is a logical oncogene candidate and therapeutic target.

Expression analysis has implicated IQGAP1 in colorectal, squamous cell, breast, gastric, liver, lung, and ovarian cancers, and in some of these cancers, higher IQGAP1 expression levels indicate a poor prognosis.

In order for a cancer to metastasize, cells must gain migratory abilities and invade other tissues. Through Rac1/CDC42, IQGAP1 regulates cellular adhesion and actin dynamics.

In normal cells IQGAP1 localizes to areas of high actin turnover. This characteristic is echoed in invasive tissues, where IQGAP1 localizes to the leading edge of migrating cells. Over-expression of IQGAP1 was associated with increased migration and invasion in a human breast epithelial cancer cell line (MCF-7 cells). IQGAP1 may also be involved in the deregulation of proliferation and differentiation through its modulation of the ERK MAPK pathway.

IQGAP1 may be necessary for tumorigenesis. IQGAP1 knockdown in MCF-7 cancer cells reduced the malignant phenotype (serum-dependent proliferation and anchorage independent growth). 100% of mice injected with MCF-7 cells overexpressing IQGAP1 developed tumors and these tumors were highly invasive. Control MCF-7 cells formed tumors in 60% of the mice, and MCF-7 cells with stable knockdown of IQGAP1 only formed tumors 20% of the time. The mechanism for how IQGAP1 may modulate tumorigenesis/invasion through its various binding partners is of great interest.

IQGAP1 null mice appear significantly normal, with the only life history abnormality being an increase in gastric hyperplasia. Thus, IQGAP1 may be an effective therapeutic target, if its knockdown has little effect in homeostatic tissue but its expression is important in cancer.
