= CLIP1 =

Protein-coding gene in humans

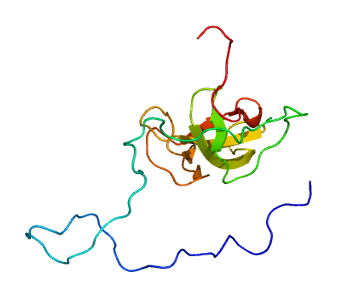
Available structures
PDB	Ortholog search: PDBe RCSB
PDB	List of PDB id codes 2CP5, 2CP6, 2E3H, 2E3I, 2E4H, 2HQH, 2QK0, 3E2U, 3RDV

Identifiers
- Aliases: CLIP1, CLIP, CLIP-170, CLIP170, CYLN1, RSN, CAP-Gly domain containing linker protein 1
- External IDs: OMIM: 179838; MGI: 1928401; HomoloGene: 74455; GeneCards: CLIP1; OMA:CLIP1 - orthologs

Gene location (Human)
Chr.	Chromosome 12 (human)
Band	12q24.31	Start	122,271,432 bp
Band	12q24.31	End	122,422,669 bp

Gene location (Mouse)
Chr.	Chromosome 5 (mouse)
Band	5|5 F	Start	123,577,795 bp
Band	5|5 F	End	123,684,618 bp
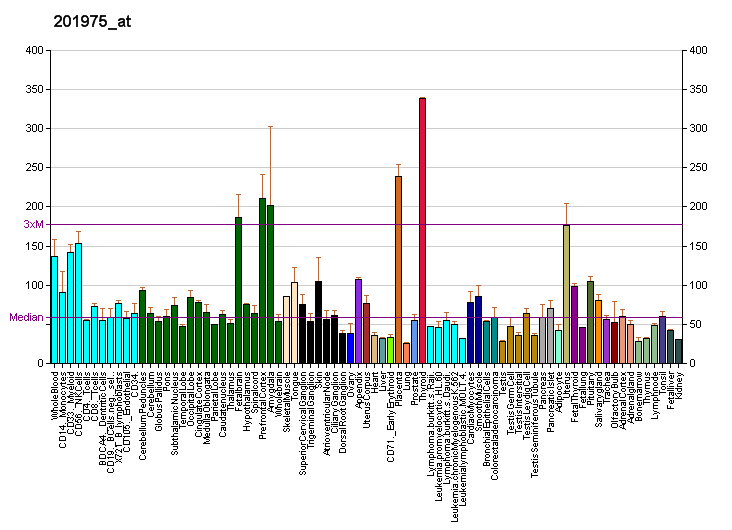

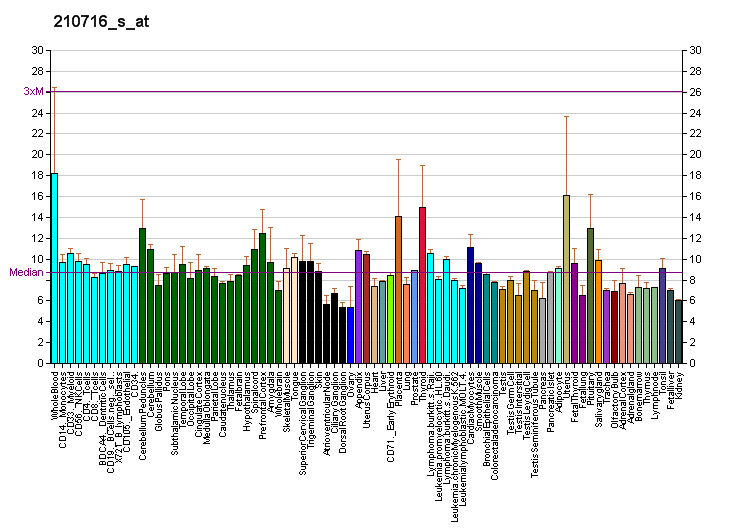
RNA expression pattern
Bgee	Human / Mouse (ortholog); Top expressed in: biceps brachii; buccal mucosa cell; Skeletal muscle tissue of rectus abdominis; Skeletal muscle tissue of biceps brachii; gastrocnemius muscle; muscle of thigh; tendon of biceps brachii; tail of epididymis; gingival epithelium; amniotic fluid / Top expressed in: vastus lateralis muscle; muscle of thigh; triceps brachii muscle; temporal muscle; medial head of gastrocnemius muscle; sternocleidomastoid muscle; digastric muscle; tibialis anterior muscle; soleus muscle; lobe of cerebellum; More reference expression data
BioGPS	More reference expression data
Gene ontology
Molecular function	protein homodimerization activity; microtubule binding; microtubule plus-end binding; metal ion binding; tubulin binding; protein binding; zinc ion binding; identical protein binding
Cellular component	cytosol; endosome; centrosome; cell projection; membrane; microtubule cytoskeleton; ruffle; microtubule plus-end; macropinosome; cytoplasmic microtubule; microtubule; cytoskeleton; intermediate filament; cytoplasmic vesicle membrane; cytoplasmic vesicle; kinetochore; nuclear envelope; cytoplasm
Biological process	microtubule bundle formation; positive regulation of microtubule polymerization; protein transport into plasma membrane raft; mitotic cell cycle
Sources:Amigo / QuickGO
Orthologs
Species	Human	Mouse
Entrez	6249	56430
Ensembl	ENSG00000130779	ENSMUSG00000049550
UniProt	P30622	Q922J3
RefSeq (mRNA)	NM_001247997; NM_002956; NM_198240; NM_001389291	NM_001291229; NM_019765; NM_001347468; NM_001359220; NM_001359221 NM_001359222; NM_001359223; NM_001359224
RefSeq (protein)	NP_001234926; NP_002947; NP_937883	NP_001278158; NP_001334397; NP_062739; NP_001346149; NP_001346150 NP_001346151; NP_001346152; NP_001346153
Location (UCSC)	Chr 12: 122.27 – 122.42 Mb	Chr 5: 123.58 – 123.68 Mb
PubMed search
- Wikidata
View/Edit Human	View/Edit Mouse

CAP-Gly domain containing linker protein 1, also known as CLIP1, is a protein which in humans is encoded by the CLIP1 gene.

== Interactions ==
CLIP1 has been shown to interact with IQGAP1, Mammalian target of rapamycin and PAFAH1B1.
