= P120 catenin =

Protein found in humans

CTNND1
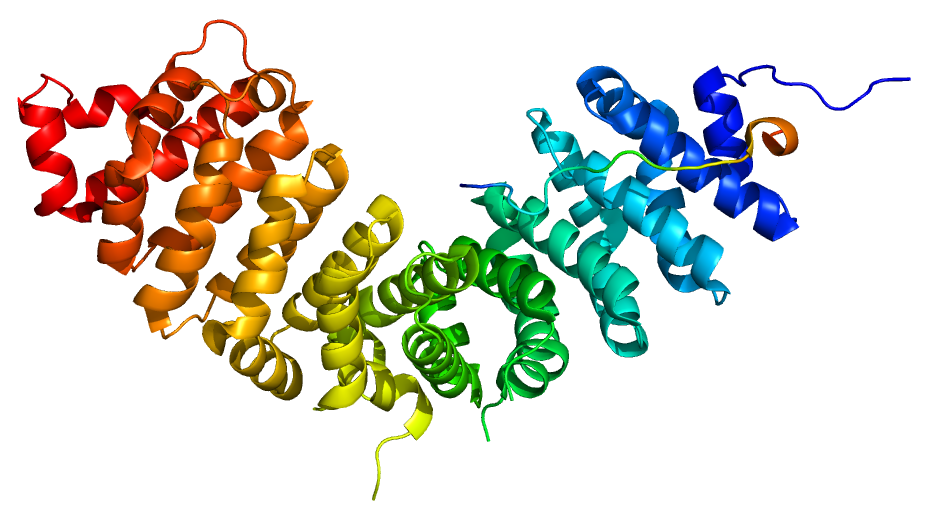

Identifiers
- Aliases: CTNND1, CAS, CTNND, P120CAS, P120CTN, p120, p120(CAS), p120(CTN), catenin delta 1, BCDS2
- External IDs: OMIM: 601045; MGI: 105100; GeneCards: CTNND1
Available structures
PDB	Ortholog search: PDBe RCSB
PDB	List of PDB id codes 3L6X, 3L6Y

Gene location (Human)
Chr.	Chromosome 11 (human)
Band	11q12.1	Start	57,753,243 bp
Band	11q12.1	End	57,819,546 bp

Gene location (Mouse)
Chr.	Chromosome 2 (mouse)
Band	2 D|2 49.45 cM	Start	84,430,415 bp
Band	2 D|2 49.45 cM	End	84,481,109 bp
RNA expression pattern
Bgee	Human / Mouse (ortholog); Top expressed in: ventricular zone; mucosa of esophagus; epithelium of colon; placenta; skin of abdomen; skin of leg; rectum; body of pancreas; minor salivary glands; sural nerve / Top expressed in: tail of embryo; genital tubercle; ovary; jejunum; placenta; ileum; colon; lip; esophagus; lung; More reference expression data
BioGPS	n/a
Gene ontology
Molecular function	protein binding; signaling receptor binding; protein kinase binding; cell adhesion molecule binding; cadherin binding
Cellular component	cytoplasm; cytosol; membrane; cell-cell junction; growth cone; plasma membrane; dendritic spine; synapse; midbody; zonula adherens; extracellular exosome; nucleus; lamellipodium; catenin complex; Schaffer collateral - CA1 synapse; hippocampal mossy fiber to CA3 synapse; presynaptic active zone cytoplasmic component; glutamatergic synapse; postsynaptic density, intracellular component
Biological process	regulation of transcription, DNA-templated; Wnt signaling pathway; transcription, DNA-templated; brain development; cell adhesion; adherens junction organization; negative regulation of canonical Wnt signaling pathway; entry of bacterium into host cell; cell-cell adhesion; cell-cell junction assembly; regulation of postsynaptic membrane neurotransmitter receptor levels
Sources:Amigo / QuickGO
Orthologs
Databases	NCBI: entry; OMA: entry
Species	Human	Mouse
Entrez	1500	12388
Ensembl	ENSG00000198561	ENSMUSG00000034101
UniProt	O60716	P30999
RefSeq (mRNA)	NM_001331; NM_001085458; NM_001085459; NM_001085460; NM_001085461 NM_001085462; NM_001085463; NM_001085464; NM_001085465; NM_001085466; NM_001085467; NM_001085468; NM_001085469; NM_001206883; NM_001206884; NM_001206885; NM_001206886; NM_001206887; NM_001206888; NM_001206889; NM_001206890; NM_001206891	NM_001085448; NM_001085449; NM_001085450; NM_001085453; NM_007615 NM_001355064; NM_001355065; NM_001355066; NM_001355067
RefSeq (protein)	NP_001078927; NP_001078928; NP_001078929; NP_001078930; NP_001078931 NP_001078932; NP_001078933; NP_001078934; NP_001078935; NP_001078936; NP_001078937; NP_001078938; NP_001193812; NP_001193813; NP_001193814; NP_001193815; NP_001193816; NP_001193817; NP_001193818; NP_001193819; NP_001193820; NP_001322	NP_001078917; NP_001078918; NP_001078919; NP_001078922; NP_031641 NP_001341993; NP_001341994; NP_001341995; NP_001341996
Location (UCSC)	Chr 11: 57.75 – 57.82 Mb	Chr 2: 84.43 – 84.48 Mb
PubMed search
- Wikidata
View/Edit Human	View/Edit Mouse

p120 catenin, or simply p120, also called catenin delta-1, is a protein that in humans is encoded by the CTNND1 gene.

== Function ==
This gene encodes a member of the Armadillo protein family, which function in adhesion between cells and signal transduction. Multiple translation initiation codons and alternative splicing result in many different isoforms being translated. Not all of the full-length natures of the described transcript variants have been determined.

== Clinical significance ==
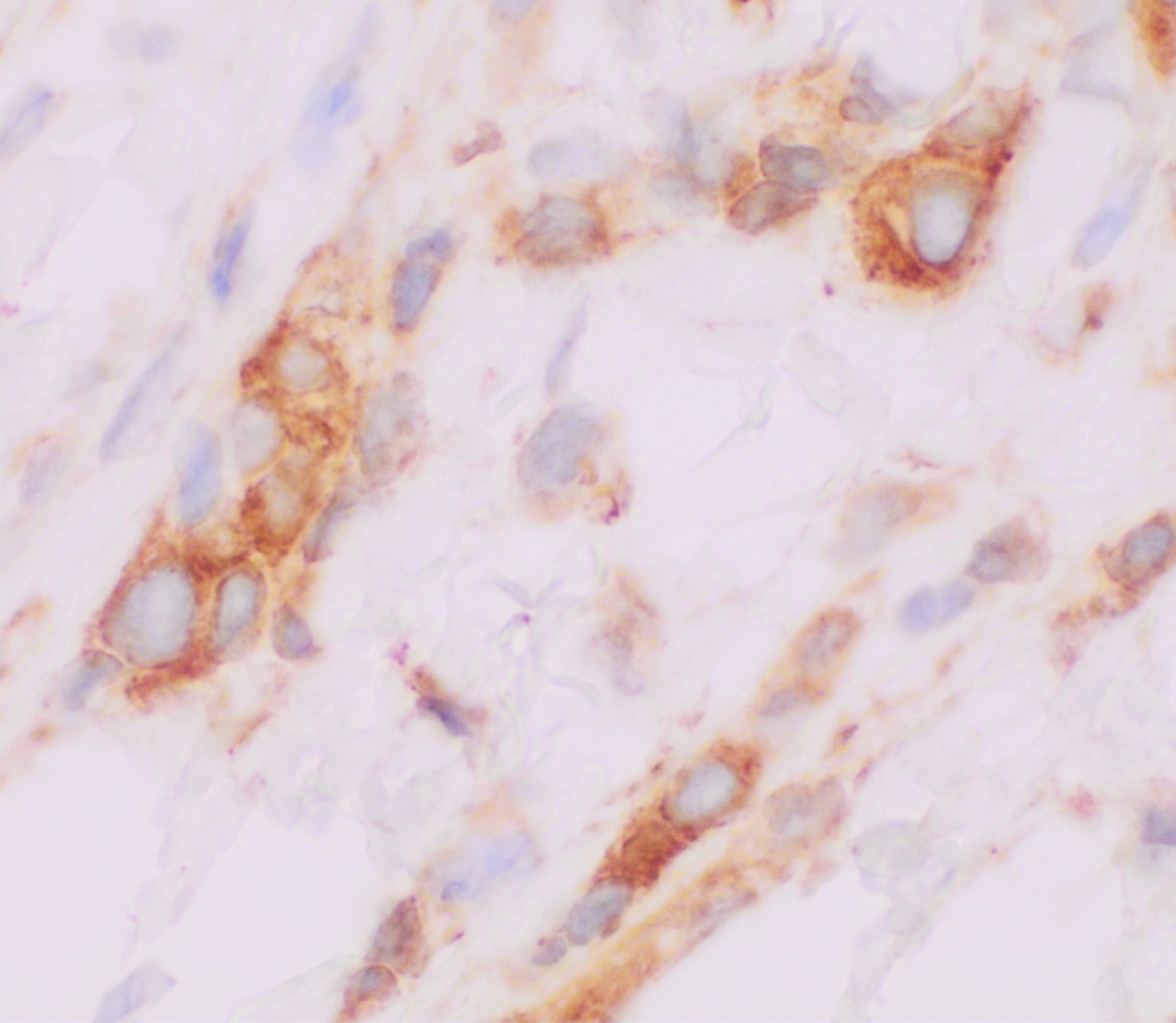
Immunohistochemistry for p120 has cytoplasmic staining in invasive lobular carcinoma (shown), but has membranous staining in invasive ductal carcinoma, thereby helping to distinguish these cancer types.

Either loss or cytoplasmic localization of p120 is a common feature in the progression of several types of carcinoma.

== Interactions ==
CTNND1 has been shown to interact with:

- β-Catenin,
- CDH1,
- CDH2,
- Collagen, type XVII, alpha 1,
- Cortactin,
- FYN,
- MUC1,
- Nephrin,
- PSEN1,
- PTPN6,
- PTPRJ,
- PTPRM,
- VE-cadherin,
- YES1, and
- ZBTB33

== See also ==
- δ-Catenin
- Catenin
- CTNND2
