= BCCIP =

Protein-coding gene in the species Homo sapiens

Identifiers
- Aliases: BCCIP, TOK-1, TOK1, BRCA2 and CDKN1A interacting protein
- External IDs: OMIM: 611883; MGI: 1913415; HomoloGene: 41629; GeneCards: BCCIP; OMA:BCCIP - orthologs

Gene location (Human)
Chr.	Chromosome 10 (human)
Band	10q26.2	Start	125,823,546 bp
Band	10q26.2	End	125,853,695 bp

Gene location (Mouse)
Chr.	Chromosome 7 (mouse)
Band	7|7 F3	Start	133,311,062 bp
Band	7|7 F3	End	133,322,874 bp
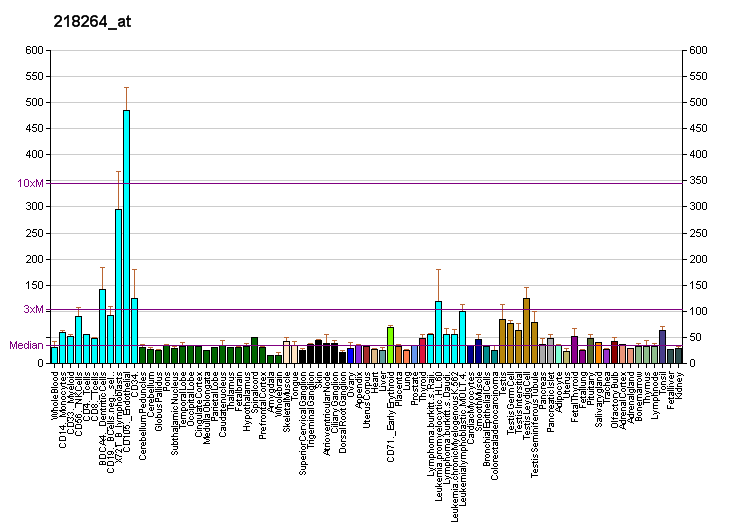
RNA expression pattern
Bgee	Human / Mouse (ortholog); Top expressed in: ventricular zone; testicle; gonad; olfactory zone of nasal mucosa; ganglionic eminence; parotid gland; gastrocnemius muscle; oocyte; islet of Langerhans; rectum / Top expressed in: otic placode; maxillary prominence; primitive streak; mandibular prominence; saccule; yolk sac; hair follicle; epiblast; neural layer of retina; triceps brachii muscle; More reference expression data
BioGPS	More reference expression data
Gene ontology
Molecular function	protein binding; kinase regulator activity; RNA binding; tubulin binding
Cellular component	nuclear cyclin-dependent protein kinase holoenzyme complex; nucleus; nucleoplasm; cytosol; centrosome; mitotic spindle pole; spindle pole; cytoplasm; centriole; microtubule organizing center; cytoskeleton
Biological process	cell cycle; regulation of cyclin-dependent protein serine/threonine kinase activity; neuroendocrine cell differentiation; DNA repair; cellular response to DNA damage stimulus; establishment of mitotic spindle orientation; microtubule cytoskeleton organization; mitotic spindle organization; microtubule anchoring; mitotic spindle assembly; ribosomal large subunit export from nucleus
Sources:Amigo / QuickGO
Orthologs
Species	Human	Mouse
Entrez	56647	66165
Ensembl	ENSG00000107949	ENSMUSG00000030983
UniProt	Q9P287	Q9CWI3
RefSeq (mRNA)	NM_078469; NM_016567; NM_078468	NM_025392
RefSeq (protein)	NP_057651; NP_510868; NP_510869	NP_079668
Location (UCSC)	Chr 10: 125.82 – 125.85 Mb	Chr 7: 133.31 – 133.32 Mb
PubMed search
- Wikidata
View/Edit Human	View/Edit Mouse

BRCA2 and CDKN1A-interacting protein is a protein that is encoded by the BCCIP gene in humans.

This gene product was isolated based on its interaction with BRCA2 and p21 proteins. It is an evolutionarily conserved nuclear protein with multiple interacting domains. The N-terminal half shares moderate homology with regions of calmodulin and M-calpain, suggesting that it may also bind calcium. Functional studies indicate that this protein may be an important cofactor for BRCA2 in tumor suppression, and a modulator of CDK2 kinase activity via p21. Several transcript variants encoding different isoforms have been described for this gene.

== Interactions ==
BCCIP has been shown to interact with BRCA2, P21, and PTPmu (PTPRM)
