= GAPVD1 =

Protein-coding gene in the species Homo sapiens

Identifiers
- Aliases: GAPVD1, GAPEX5, GAPex-5, RAP6, GTPase activating protein and VPS9 domains 1
- External IDs: OMIM: 611714; MGI: 1913941; GeneCards: GAPVD1

Gene location (Human)
Chr.	Chromosome 9 (human)
Band	9q33.3	Start	125,261,794 bp
Band	9q33.3	End	125,367,207 bp

Gene location (Mouse)
Chr.	Chromosome 2 (mouse)
Band	2|2 B	Start	34,674,594 bp
Band	2|2 B	End	34,755,232 bp
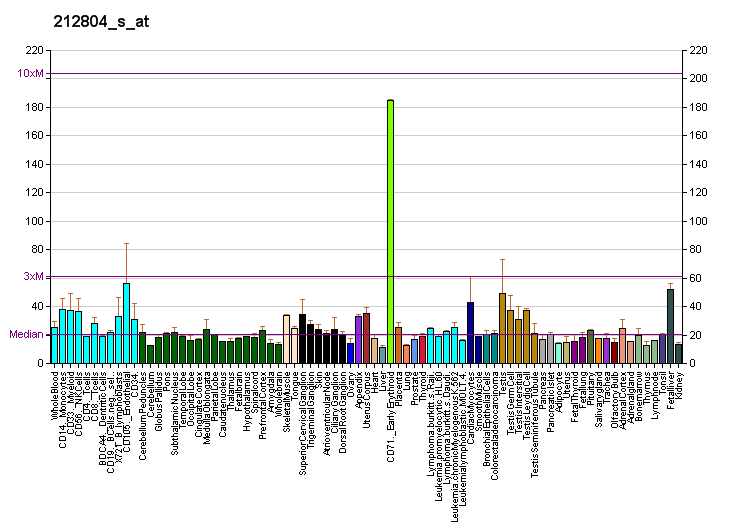

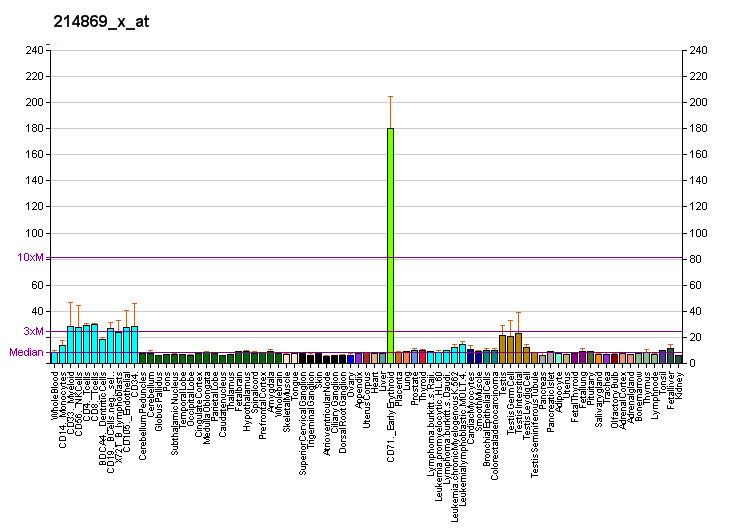

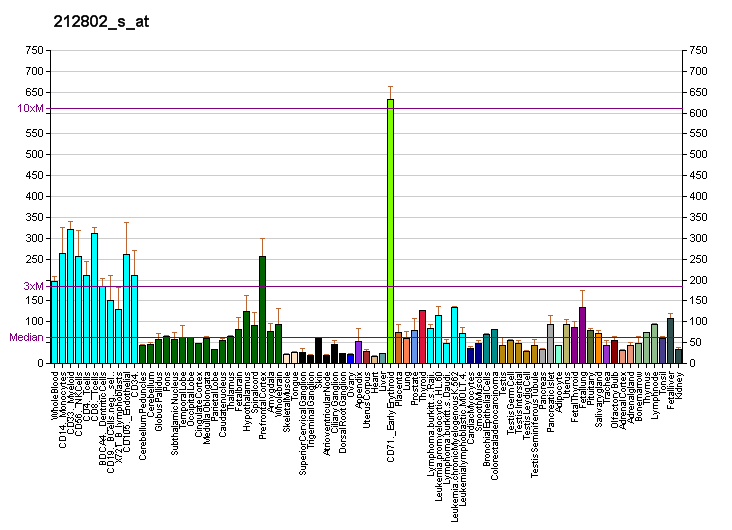
RNA expression pattern
Bgee	Human / Mouse (ortholog); Top expressed in: bronchial epithelial cell; nasal epithelium; amniotic fluid; palpebral conjunctiva; skin of thigh; mucosa of paranasal sinus; Brodmann area 23; cartilage tissue; visceral pleura; middle temporal gyrus / Top expressed in: hand; otolith organ; utricle; Rostral migratory stream; superior cervical ganglion; hair follicle; stroma of bone marrow; ciliary body; foot; conjunctival fornix; More reference expression data
BioGPS	More reference expression data
Gene ontology
Molecular function	GTPase activating protein binding; GTPase activator activity; guanyl-nucleotide exchange factor activity; cadherin binding; protein binding
Cellular component	endosome; membrane; cytosol
Biological process	regulation of GTPase activity; endocytosis; regulation of protein transport; signal transduction; positive regulation of GTPase activity; membrane organization
Sources:Amigo / QuickGO
Orthologs
Databases	NCBI: entry; OMA: entry
Species	Human	Mouse
Entrez	26130	66691
Ensembl	ENSG00000165219	ENSMUSG00000026867
UniProt	Q14C86	Q6PAR5
RefSeq (mRNA)	NM_001282679; NM_001282680; NM_001282681; NM_015635; NM_001330777 NM_001330778; NM_001354293; NM_001354294; NM_001354295; NM_001354296; NM_001354297; NM_001354298; NM_001354299; NM_001354300; NM_001354301	NM_025709; NM_001356441
RefSeq (protein)	NP_001269608; NP_001269609; NP_001269610; NP_001317706; NP_001317707 NP_056450; NP_001341222; NP_001341223; NP_001341224; NP_001341225; NP_001341226; NP_001341227; NP_001341228; NP_001341229; NP_001341230	NP_079985; NP_001343370
Location (UCSC)	Chr 9: 125.26 – 125.37 Mb	Chr 2: 34.67 – 34.76 Mb
PubMed search
- Wikidata
View/Edit Human	View/Edit Mouse

GTPase activating protein and VPS9 domains 1, also known as GAPVD1, Gapex-5 and RME-6 is a protein which in humans is encoded by the GAPVD1 gene.

== Function ==
GAPVD1 is Rab GTPase guanine nucleotide exchange factor essential for activation of RAB5A during engulfment of apoptotic cells. GAPVD1 is also involved in the degradation of the epidermal growth factor receptor. Gapex-5 mediated activation of Rab5 has been implicated in the insulin stimulated formation of plasma membrane phosphatidylinositol-3-phosphate.

== Structure ==
Based on sequence homology, mammalian Gapex-5 has been shown to have an amino-terminal Ras GAP domain, a central polyproline (SH3 binding) region and a carboxy-terminal Rab GEF domain. The RabGEF domain has been suggested to activate Rab5 and Rab31.
