= PTPRM =

Protein-coding gene in the species Homo sapiens

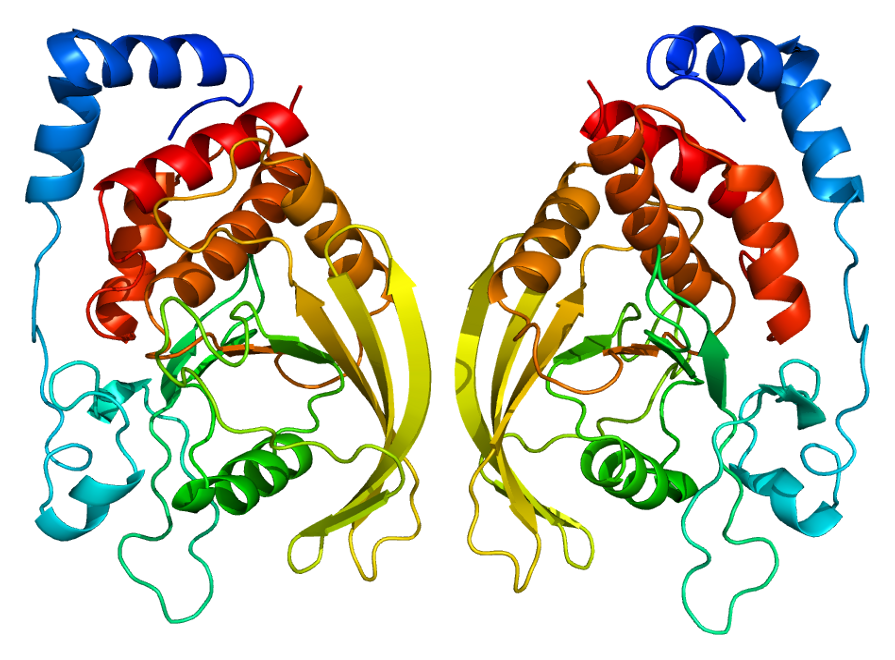

Identifiers
- Aliases: PTPRM, PTPRL1, R-PTP-MU, RPTPM, RPTPU, hR-PTPu, protein tyrosine phosphatase, receptor type M, protein tyrosine phosphatase receptor type M
- External IDs: OMIM: 176888; MGI: 102694; GeneCards: PTPRM
Available structures
| PDB | Ortholog search: PDBe RCSB |
| PDB | List of PDB id codes 1RPM, 2C9A, 2V5Y |
Enzyme activity
| EC # | BRENDA | ExPASy | KEGG | MetaCyc |
|---|---|---|---|---|
| 3.1.3.48 | ↗ | ↗ | ↗ | ↗ |

Gene location (Human)
| Chr. | Chromosome 18 (human) |
| Band | 18p11.23 | Start | 7,566,782 bp |
| Band | 18p11.23 | End | 8,406,861 bp |

Gene location (Mouse)
| Chr. | Chromosome 17 (mouse) |
| Band | 17 E1.1|17 37.88 cM | Start | 66,973,942 bp |
| Band | 17 E1.1|17 37.88 cM | End | 67,661,452 bp |
RNA expression pattern
| Bgee | Human / Mouse (ortholog); Top expressed in: ventricular zone; visceral pleura; right lung; Achilles tendon; lateral nuclear group of thalamus; tibia; left lobe of thyroid gland; right lobe of thyroid gland; subcutaneous adipose tissue; ventricle of the heart / Top expressed in: left lung lobe; right ventricle; right lung; cardiac muscle tissue of left ventricle; right lung lobe; cerebellar vermis; lobe of cerebellum; ventromedial nucleus; lateral geniculate nucleus; aortic valve; More reference expression data |
| BioGPS | n/a |
Gene ontology
| Molecular function | phosphoprotein phosphatase activity; phosphatase activity; cadherin binding; protein binding; identical protein binding; protein tyrosine phosphatase activity; transmembrane receptor protein tyrosine phosphatase activity; hydrolase activity |
| Cellular component | cytoplasm; integral component of membrane; membrane; cell-cell junction; integral component of plasma membrane; perinuclear region of cytoplasm; lamellipodium; plasma membrane |
| Biological process | dephosphorylation; retina layer formation; protein dephosphorylation; negative regulation of endothelial cell migration; negative regulation of endothelial cell proliferation; cell adhesion; negative regulation of angiogenesis; neuron projection development; signal transduction; homophilic cell adhesion via plasma membrane adhesion molecules; retinal ganglion cell axon guidance; peptidyl-tyrosine dephosphorylation |
Sources:Amigo / QuickGO
Orthologs
| Databases | NCBI: entry; OMA: entry |
| Species | Human | Mouse |
| Entrez | 5797 | 19274 |
| Ensembl | ENSG00000173482 | ENSMUSG00000033278 |
| UniProt | P28827 | P28828 |
| RefSeq (mRNA) | NM_001105244; NM_002845; NM_001378142; NM_001378143; NM_001378144 NM_001378145; NM_001378146; NM_001378147 | NM_008984; NM_001357625 |
| RefSeq (protein) | NP_001098714; NP_002836; NP_001365071; NP_001365072; NP_001365073 NP_001365074; NP_001365075; NP_001365076 | NP_033010; NP_001344554 |
| Location (UCSC) | Chr 18: 7.57 – 8.41 Mb | Chr 17: 66.97 – 67.66 Mb |
| PubMed search |
- Wikidata
| View/Edit Human | View/Edit Mouse |

Receptor-type tyrosine-protein phosphatase mu is an enzyme that in humans is encoded by the PTPRM gene.

== Function ==
The protein encoded by this gene is a member of the protein tyrosine phosphatase (PTP) family. Protein tyrosine phosphatases are protein enzymes that remove phosphate moieties from tyrosine residues on other proteins. Tyrosine kinases are enzymes that add phosphates to tyrosine residues, and are the opposing enzymes to PTPs. PTPs are known to be signaling molecules that regulate a variety of cellular processes including cell growth, differentiation, mitotic cycle, and oncogenic transformation. PTPs can be both cytosolic and transmembrane.

== Structure ==
Transmembrane PTPs are known as receptor protein tyrosine phosphatases (RPTPs). RPTPs are single pass transmembrane proteins usually with one or two catalytic domains in their intracellular domain (the part of the protein that is inside the cell) and diverse extracellular structures (the part of the protein that is outside the cell).

PTPmu possesses an extracellular region, a single transmembrane region, a 158 amino acid long juxtamembrane domain and two tandem tyrosine phosphatase domains (referred to as D1 and D2) in its intracellular domain, and thus represents an RPTP. Only the membrane proximal phosphatase domain, D1, is catalytically active. The extracellular region contains a meprin-A5 antigen-PTP mu (MAM) domain, an Ig-like domain and four fibronectin type III-like repeats. There are other RPTPs that resemble PTPmu. These proteins are all grouped as type IIb RPTPs, and include PTPkappa (κ), PTPrho (ρ), and PCP-2. The structure of type IIb RPTPs classifies them as members of the immunoglobulin superfamily of cell adhesion molecules, in addition to being tyrosine phosphatases. The structure of PTPmu suggests that it can regulate cell adhesion and migration using its extracellular cell adhesion molecule features, while also regulating the level of tyrosine phosphorylation inside of cells using its catalytic tyrosine phosphatase domain. A series of reviews have been written about RPTPs including PTPmu. PTPmu is expressed in different organ tissues in the body, including the lung, heart and brain, pancreas, endothelial cells in capillaries and arteries throughout the body, and in retinal and brain cells. PTPmu has been shown to increase the mRNA of the K+ channel Kv1.5 in cardiac myocytes when CHO cells expressing PTPmu are cultured with cardiac myocytes.

== Homophilic binding ==
PTPmu protein expressed on the surface of cells is able to mediate binding between two cells, which results in the clustering of the cells, known as cell–cell aggregation. PTPmu accomplishes this by interacting with another PTPmu molecule on an adjacent cell, known as homophilic binding. The Ig domain of PTPmu is responsible for promoting homophilic binding. The Ig domain is also responsible for localizing PTPmu to the plasma membrane surface of the cell. The ability of closely related molecules like PTPmu and PTPkappa to separate themselves to associate only with their identically matched (homologous) molecules, known as sorting, is attributed to the MAM domain. The MAM, Ig, and the first two FNIII repeats are the minimum extracellular domains required for efficient cell–cell adhesion. Crystallographic studies demonstrated that the MAM and Ig domains are tightly associated into one functional entity. Additional crystal structure analysis by Aricescu and colleagues predicted that the adhesive interface between two PTPμ proteins is between the MAM and Ig domains of one PTPμ protein interacts with the first and second FN III domains of the second PTPμ protein. The type IIb RPTPs mediate adhesion, with the exception of PCP-2.

== Tyrosine phosphatase activity ==
There are a number of ways that RPTP catalytic activity can be regulated (for reviews, see). Dimerization of identical RPTP proteins at the cell surface leaves the PTP domains either in an open active conformation, as in the case of PTPmu and LAR, or in an inhibited conformation that leaves the catalytic domain inaccessible, in the case of CD45, PTPalpha, and PTPzeta/beta. The binding of different parts of the protein with itself (ex. by folding to interact with itself), known as intramolecular interactions, can affect the activity of RPTPs. The cytoplasmic domains of different RPTPs can interact to yield heterodimers of RPTP proteins, which then influence catalytic activity (for example, see).

The regulation of PTPmu catalytic activity is complex. Like most RPTPs, the membrane proximal (or D1) phosphatase domain of PTPmu is catalytically active. At high cell density, when PTPmu molecules bind to one another homophilically, phosphotyrosine levels are decreased. This suggests that PTPmu may be catalytically active at high cell density. Substrates of PTPmu (proteins that are dephosphorylated by PTPmu), such as p120catenin, tend to be dephosphorylated at high cell density, supporting the hypothesis that PTPmu is catalytically active when bound homophilically. PTPmu is constitutively dimerized due to its extracellular domain.

Crystal structure analysis of the D1 of PTPmu demonstrated that PTPmu dimers are in an open active conformation. Even though PTPmu dimers may be active, an additional study suggests that the extracellular domain of PTPmu reduces phosphatase activity. In this study, it was shown that the cytoplasmic domain of PTPmu (a PTPmu molecule lacking the extracellular domain) has greater phosphatase activity than the full-length protein in an enzymatic phosphatase assay.

PTPmu has a long juxtamembrane domain, which likely influences catalytic activity. The juxtamembrane domain of PTPmu can bind to either the D1 and/or D2 of PTPmu, but only within the same PTPmu monomer. Removal of the juxtamembrane domain from PTPmu has been suggested to reduce PTPmu phosphatase activity. The D2 domain of PTPmu also regulates its activity. Although originally demonstrated to positively regulate phosphatase activity, the D2 domain has been shown to negatively affect PTPmu catalytic activity. A wedge-shaped motif located by D1 also regulates catalytic activity. Use of a peptide with the same sequence as the wedge motif inhibits PTPmu mediated functions.

Certain stimuli may also influence PTP activity. For example, alteration of cell oxidation induces conformational changes in the cytoplasmic domain of PTPmu, which may affect its tyrosine phosphatase activity or binding of extracellular ligands.

== Cadherin-dependent adhesion ==
Classical cadherins are important proteins for cells to bind in the body (‘’in vivo’’) where they commonly stabilize cell–cell junctions known as adherens junctions. Cadherins stabilize adherens junctions through the interaction of the cadherin cytoplasmic domains with catenin proteins, such as p120-catenin, beta-catenin and alpha-catenin. Catenins, in turn, bind to the actin cytoskeleton. Binding of these proteins to the actin cytoskeleton prevents actin from growing (a process known as polymerization) and therefore keeps cells stationary. Cadherins regulate cell–cell adhesion during development of the body and in adult tissue. Disruption of cadherin proteins, by genetic alteration or by changes to the structure or function of the protein, has been linked to tumor progression. Notably, PTPmu regulates the adhesion of cells to the classical cadherins. PTPmu likely regulates cadherin-dependent adhesion by interacting with both cadherins and catenins via PTPmu’s cytoplasmic domain. To support this assertion, PTPmu has been shown to interact with and/or dephosphorylate many signaling proteins involved in regulating the cadherin-catenin complex, including p120 catenin, and E-cadherin (CDH1 (gene)) and N-cadherin (CDH2). PTPmu has also been shown to interact with the c-Met hepatocyte growth factor receptor, a protein that is also localized to adherens junctions. Although p120 catenin is a potential substrate of PTPmu, others have suggested that the interaction between PTPmu and catenins is only indirect through E-cadherin. α3β1 integrin and the tetraspanin CD151 regulate PTPmu gene expression to promote E-cadherin-mediated cell–cell adhesion.

In addition to catenins and cadherins, PTPmu dephosphorylates PIPKIγ90 and nectin-3 (PVRL3) to stabilize E-cadherin-based adherens junctions. PTPmu also dephosphorylates another cell junction protein, connexin 43. The interaction between connexin 43 and PTPmu increases gap junction communication.

== Endothelial cell adhesion ==
PTPμ is expressed in human umbilical cord vein endothelial cells (HUVEC) and in capillaries in the developing brain. The expression of PTPμ in HUVEC cells increases at higher cell density. Studies of PTPμ expression in animal tissues have demonstrated that PTPμ is preferentially expressed in endothelial cells of arteries and capillaries and in cardiac smooth muscle, in addition to brain cells. Because of this specialized expression in arterial endothelial cells, and because PTPμ is found to associate with proteins involved in maintaining endothelial cell–cell junctions, such as VE-cadherin, PTPμ is hypothesized to regulate endothelial cell junction formation or permeability. PTPμ has been shown to be involved in mechanotransduction that results from changes in blood flow to influence endothelial cell-mediated blood vessel dilation, a process induced by “shear stress.” When PTPmu is missing in mice (PTPmu -/- knock-out mice), cannulated mesenteric arteries show reduced flow-induced (or “shear stress” induced) dilation. PTPmu tyrosine phosphatase activity is activated by shear stress. Caveolin 1 is a scaffolding protein enriched in endothelial cell junctions that is also linked to shear stress regulated responses. Caveolin 1 is dephosphorylated on tyrosine 14 in response to shear stress and PTPmu is hypothesized to catalyze this reaction.

== Cell migration ==
=== Neurite outgrowth ===
PTPmu is expressed in the developing brain and retina. A brain cell, or neuron, has a cell body that contains the nucleus and two types of extensions or processes that grow out from the cell body, the dendrites and axons. Dendrites generally receive input from other neurons, while axons send output to adjacent neurons. These processes are called neurites when grown ‘’in vitro’’ on tissue culture plates, because it is not clear whether they are dendrites or axons. ‘’In vitro’’ growth studies are useful for evaluating the mechanisms that neurons use to grow and function. A neurite outgrowth assay is a type of experiment where neurons are placed on different adhesive substrates on tissue culture plates. A neurite outgrowth assay is meant to mimic how neurons grow inside the body. During development of the nervous system, neuronal axons reach their often-distant targets by reacting to different substrates in their environment, so-called guidance cues, that are attractive, repulsive or simply permissive, meaning these substrates pull axons toward them, away from them, or act in a way that allows growth, respectively. When PTPmu is applied to a dish as an ‘’in vitro’’ substrate, it promotes neurite outgrowth. PTPmu also acts as a guidance cue during development of the nervous system, by repelling neurites of the temporal neural retina, while permitting growth of neurites from the nasal neural retina. Expression of PTPmu protein capable of dephosphorylating tyrosine residues is required for mediating both nasal neurite outgrowth and temporal neurite repulsion. By blocking the expression of PTPmu protein with antisense technology, or by expressing catalytically inactive mutants of PTPmu (molecules of PTPmu that can not dephosphorylate their target proteins) in the developing retina, it was shown that PTPmu is required for the development of the neural retina.

PTPmu also regulates neurite outgrowth on classical cadherins. PTPmu tyrosine phosphatase activity is necessary for neurite outgrowth on the classical cadherins E-, N- and R-cadherin, suggesting that PTPmu dephosphorylates key components of the cadherin-catenin complex to regulate axonal migration. Again, this emphasizes that PTPmu likely regulates cadherin-dependent processes via its cytoplasmic domain.

Various signals required for PTPmu-mediated neurite outgrowth and repulsion have been identified. Some of these signals are proteins that interact with, or bind, to PTPmu, whereas, others may be dephosphorylated by PTPmu. PTPmu interacts with the scaffolding proteins RACK1/GNB2L1, and IQGAP1. IQGAP1 is a scaffold for Rho family of GTPases, E-cadherin, beta-catenin and other proteins. IQGAP1 binding to Rho GTPases is necessary for PTPmu-mediated neurite outgrowth. The growing tip of the neuron, the growth cone, has a distinct appearance depending on what signals are activated inside the growth cone when it touches different substrates. The morphology of the growth cones on PTPmu and the repulsion of temporal neurites are both regulated by the Rho GTPase family member, Cdc42. Inhibition of the Rho GTPase Rac1 permitted neurite outgrowth on PTPmu from neurons in the temporal retina.

The proteins PLCγ1 (PLCG1), PKCδ (PRKCD) and BCCIP are PTPmu substrates. PKCδ activity is required for PTPmu mediated neurite outgrowth and PTPmu-mediated neurite repulsion. Expression of BCCIP is necessary for PTPmu-mediated neurite outgrowth. PTPmu is cleaved in certain brain cancers, which results in nuclear translocation of the cytoplasmic domain of PTPmu (see below). A possible function for the BCCIP-PTPmu interaction may be to shuttle the intracellular PTPmu fragment into the cell nucleus. In summary, PTPmu dephosphorylates PKCδ, PLCγ1, and BCCIP, and binds to IQGAP1. The expression and/or activity of all these proteins and Cdc42 is necessary for PTPmu-mediated neurite outgrowth. Also, the activity of the GTPase Rac1 promotes PTPmu-mediated neurite repulsion.

=== Cancer ===
PTPmu is downregulated in glioblastoma multiforme (GBM) cells and tissue compared to normal control tissue or cells. The reduction in PTPmu expression in GBM cells has been linked to increased migration of GBM cells. It was found that PTPmu expression is decreased in GBM cells by proteolysis of the full-length protein into a shed extracellular fragment and a cytoplasmically released intracellular fragment that is capable of translocating into the nucleus. Cleavage of PTPmu is similar to that identified for the Notch signaling pathway. PTPmu is first cleaved to yield two non-covalently associated fragments, likely via a furin-like endo-peptidase in the endoplasmic reticulum (ER), as has been demonstrated for another RPTP, LAR (or PTPRF). Then PTPmu is likely cleaved by an A disintegrin and metalloproteinase (ADAM) protease in the extracellular domain of PTPmu to release the shed extracellular fragment, then by the gamma secretase complex in the transmembrane domain to release the PTPmu intracellular fragment (reviewed in and Cleavage of PTPmu would likely impact the signaling partners that PTPmu would have access to, as has been proposed. (Phillips-Mason, Craig and Brady-Kalnay, 2011). PLCγ1 is a PTPmu substrate. PLCγ1 activity is necessary for mediating GBM cell migration in the absence of PTPmu, thus it seems likely that PTPmu dephosphorylation of PLCγ1 prevents PLCγ1-mediated migration. Cleavage of cell adhesion molecules, like PTPmu, has also been linked to the deregulation of contact inhibition of growth observed in cancer cells. Visualization of the shed extracellular fragment of PTPmu has been proposed to be an effective means of delineating the borders of a GBM tumor ‘’in vivo.’’ Fluorescently tagged PTPmu peptides that bind homophilically to the shed PTPmu extracellular domains are capable of crossing the blood–brain barrier and identifying tumor margins in rodent models of GBM.

== Interactions ==
PTPRM has been shown to interact with:

- BCCIP,
- c-Met,
- CDH1 E-cadherin (Cadherin-1),
- CDH2 N-cadherin (Cadherin-2),
- CDH4 R-cadherin (cadherin-4),
- CDH5 VE-cadherin (cadherin 5, CDH5),
- CTNND1 (p120catenin),
- GNB2L1/RACK1,
- GJA1 connexin43 (gap junction protein, alpha 1),
- IQGAP1,
- PVRL3 (nectin3),
- PIPKIγ90,
- PRKCD (PKCδ), and
- PLCG1 (PLCγ1).
