= CDH4 =

Protein-coding gene in humans

Identifiers
- Aliases: CDH4, CAD4, R-CAD, RCAD, cadherin 4
- External IDs: OMIM: 603006; MGI: 99218; GeneCards: CDH4

Gene location (Human)
Chr.	Chromosome 20 (human)
Band	20q13.33	Start	61,252,261 bp
Band	20q13.33	End	61,940,617 bp

Gene location (Mouse)
Chr.	Chromosome 2 (mouse)
Band	2 H4|2 101.86 cM	Start	179,084,224 bp
Band	2 H4|2 101.86 cM	End	179,541,166 bp
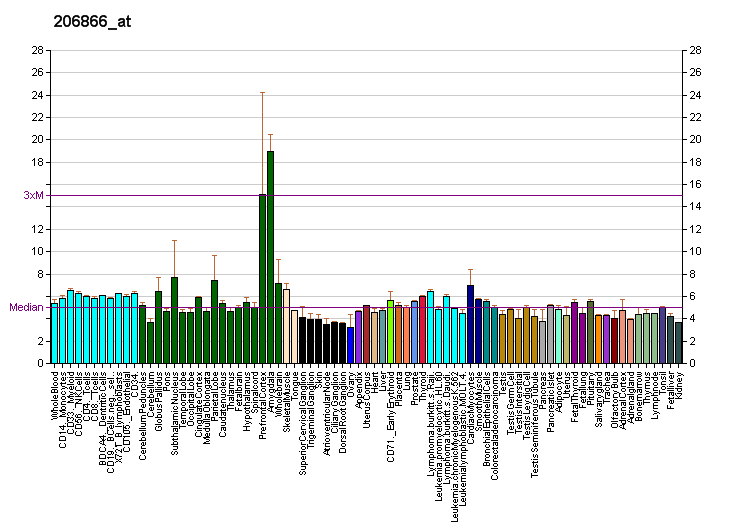
RNA expression pattern
Bgee	Human / Mouse (ortholog); Top expressed in: ventricular zone; ganglionic eminence; nucleus accumbens; temporal lobe; amygdala; caudate nucleus; anterior cingulate cortex; putamen; testicle; prefrontal cortex / Top expressed in: Bowman's capsule; saccule; anterior amygdaloid area; coelomic epithelium; epithelium of lens; glomerulus; gastrula; olfactory bulb; ganglionic eminence; otic vesicle; More reference expression data
BioGPS	More reference expression data
Gene ontology
Molecular function	calcium ion binding; metal ion binding; cytoskeletal protein binding; protein homodimerization activity; cadherin binding
Cellular component	integral component of membrane; plasma membrane; integral component of plasma membrane; membrane; cell surface; catenin complex
Biological process	heterophilic cell-cell adhesion via plasma membrane cell adhesion molecules; cell adhesion; positive regulation of axon extension; adherens junction organization; homophilic cell adhesion via plasma membrane adhesion molecules; axon guidance; cell-cell junction assembly; calcium-dependent cell-cell adhesion via plasma membrane cell adhesion molecules; cell-cell adhesion mediated by cadherin; cell-cell adhesion; cell morphogenesis
Sources:Amigo / QuickGO
Orthologs
Databases	NCBI: entry; OMA: entry
Species	Human	Mouse
Entrez	1002	12561
Ensembl	ENSG00000280641; ENSG00000179242	ENSMUSG00000000305
UniProt	P55283	P39038
RefSeq (mRNA)	NM_001794; NM_001252338; NM_001252339	NM_009867; NM_001316723
RefSeq (protein)	NP_001239267; NP_001239268; NP_001785	NP_001303652; NP_033997
Location (UCSC)	Chr 20: 61.25 – 61.94 Mb	Chr 2: 179.08 – 179.54 Mb
PubMed search
- Wikidata
View/Edit Human	View/Edit Mouse

Cadherin-4, also known as R-Cadherin (retinal) is a protein that in humans is encoded by the CDH4 gene.

This gene is a classical cadherin from the cadherin superfamily. The encoded protein is a calcium-dependent cell-cell adhesion glycoprotein composed of five extracellular cadherin repeats, a transmembrane region and a highly conserved cytoplasmic tail. Based on studies in chicken and mouse, this cadherin is thought to play an important role during brain segmentation and neuronal outgrowth. In addition, a role in kidney and muscle development is indicated. Of particular interest are studies showing stable cis-heterodimers of cadherins 2 and 4 in cotransfected cell lines. Previously thought to interact in an exclusively homophilic manner, this is the first evidence of cadherin heterodimerization.

== Interactions ==
Cadherin-4 has been shown to interact with:

- PTPmu
