= RAB31 =

Protein-coding gene in the species Homo sapiens

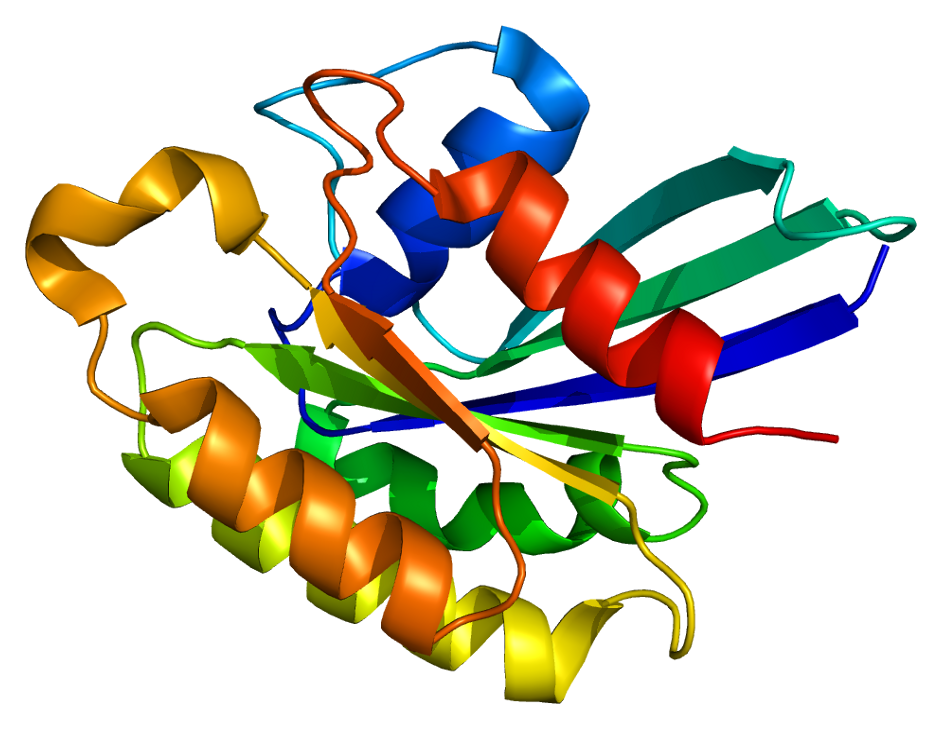

Identifiers
- Aliases: RAB31, Rab22B, member RAS oncogene family
- External IDs: OMIM: 605694; MGI: 1914603; GeneCards: RAB31
Available structures
PDB	Ortholog search: PDBe RCSB
PDB	List of PDB id codes 2FG5
Enzyme activity
EC #	BRENDA	ExPASy	KEGG	MetaCyc
3.6.5.2	↗	↗	↗	↗

Gene location (Human)
Chr.	Chromosome 18 (human)
Band	18p11.22	Start	9,708,275 bp
Band	18p11.22	End	9,862,551 bp

Gene location (Mouse)
Chr.	Chromosome 17 (mouse)
Band	17|17 E1.1	Start	65,958,724 bp
Band	17|17 E1.1	End	66,079,747 bp
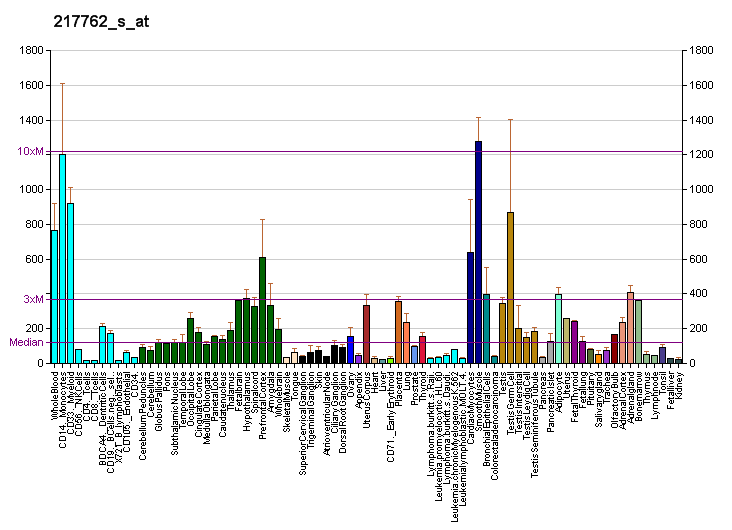

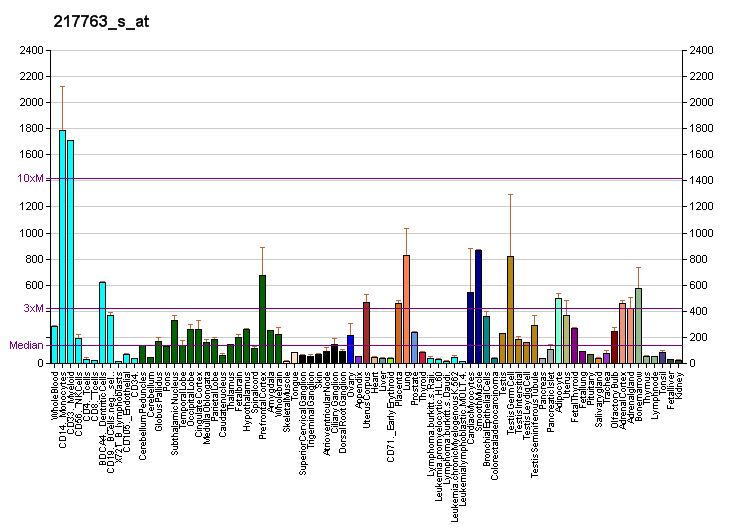

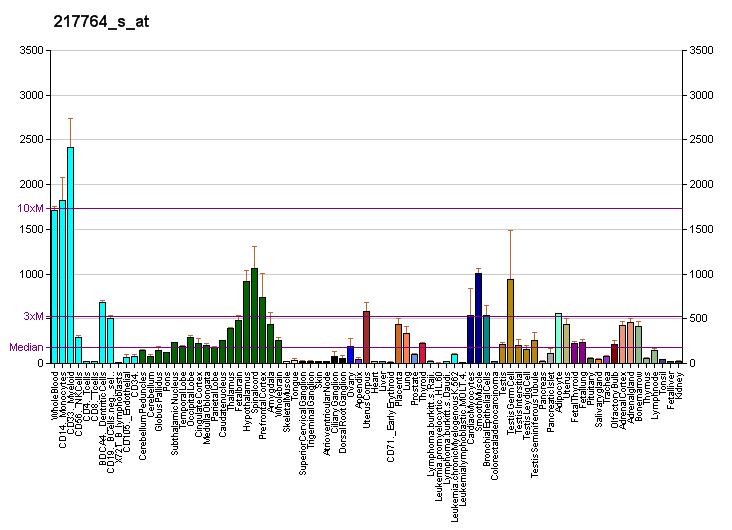
RNA expression pattern
Bgee	Human / Mouse (ortholog); Top expressed in: dorsal motor nucleus of vagus nerve; trabecular bone; internal globus pallidus; periodontal fiber; inferior olivary nucleus; saphenous vein; visceral pleura; optic nerve; tendon of biceps brachii; monocyte / Top expressed in: cumulus cell; granulocyte; endothelial cell of lymphatic vessel; stroma of bone marrow; barrel cortex; substantia nigra; ankle joint; calvaria; decidua; semi-lunar valve; More reference expression data
BioGPS	More reference expression data
Gene ontology
Molecular function	nucleotide binding; GDP binding; GTP binding; GTPase activity; protein binding
Cellular component	endosome; phagocytic vesicle membrane; Golgi apparatus; trans-Golgi network membrane; membrane; early endosome; phagocytic vesicle; cytoplasmic vesicle; cytosol; plasma membrane; secretory granule membrane; early endosome membrane; phagocytic cup; early phagosome membrane
Biological process	receptor internalization; phagosome maturation; cellular response to insulin stimulus; regulated exocytosis; Golgi to plasma membrane protein transport; neutrophil degranulation; intracellular protein transport; Rab protein signal transduction; positive regulation of phagocytosis, engulfment
Sources:Amigo / QuickGO
Orthologs
Databases	NCBI: entry; OMA: entry
Species	Human	Mouse
Entrez	11031	106572
Ensembl	ENSG00000168461	ENSMUSG00000056515
UniProt	Q13636	Q921E2
RefSeq (mRNA)	NM_006868	NM_133685
RefSeq (protein)	NP_006859	NP_598446
Location (UCSC)	Chr 18: 9.71 – 9.86 Mb	Chr 17: 65.96 – 66.08 Mb
PubMed search
- Wikidata
View/Edit Human	View/Edit Mouse

Ras-related protein Rab-31 is a protein that in humans is encoded by the RAB31 gene.
