= DIAPH1 =

Protein and coding gene in humans

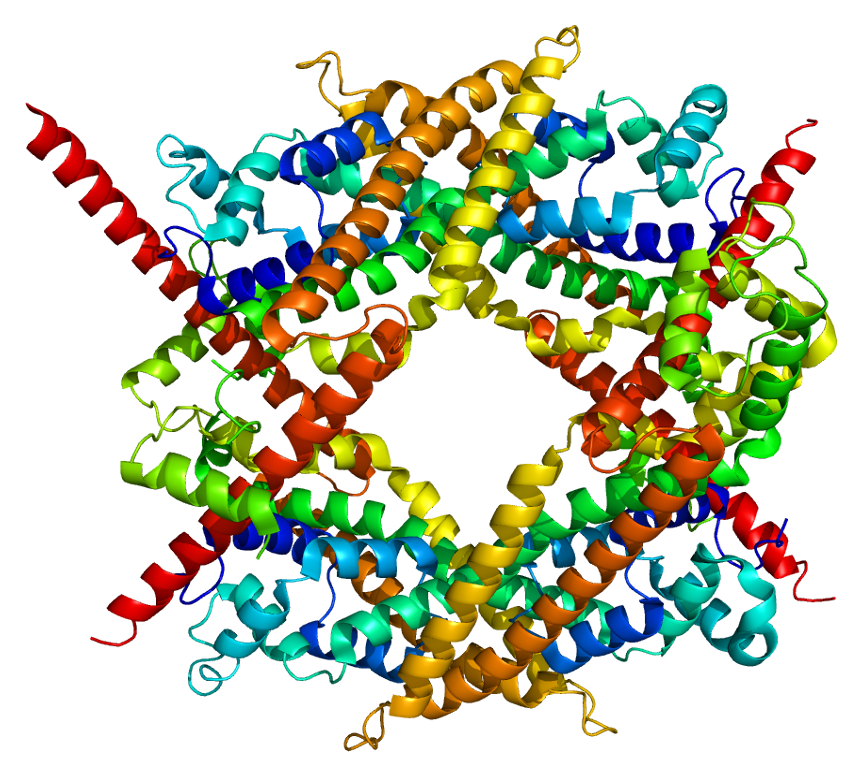

Identifiers
- Aliases: DIAPH1, DFNA1, DIA1, DRF1, LFHL1, hDIA1, SCBMS, diaphanous related formin 1, mDia1
- External IDs: OMIM: 602121; MGI: 1194490; GeneCards: DIAPH1
Available structures
PDB	Ortholog search: PDBe RCSB
PDB	List of PDB id codes 1V9D, 1Z2C, 2BAP, 2BNX, 2F31, 2V8F, 3EG5, 3O4X, 3OBV, 4UWX

Gene location (Human)
Chr.	Chromosome 5 (human)
Band	5q31.3	Start	141,515,016 bp
Band	5q31.3	End	141,619,055 bp

Gene location (Mouse)
Chr.	Chromosome 18 (mouse)
Band	18 B3|18 19.71 cM	Start	37,976,654 bp
Band	18 B3|18 19.71 cM	End	38,068,529 bp
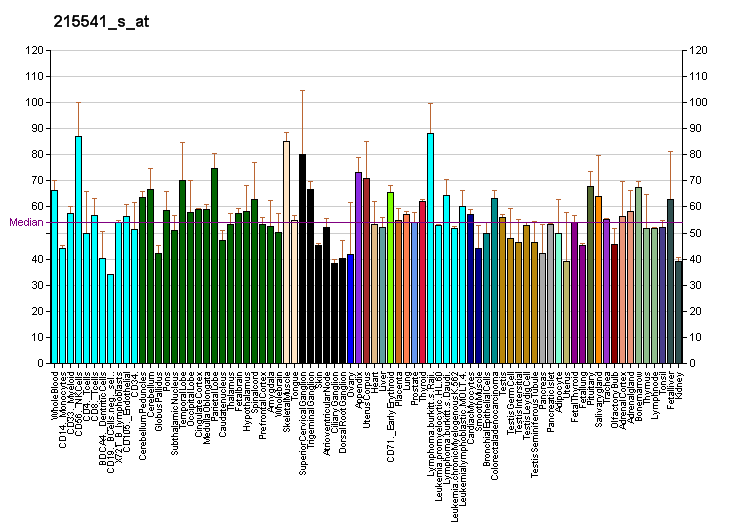

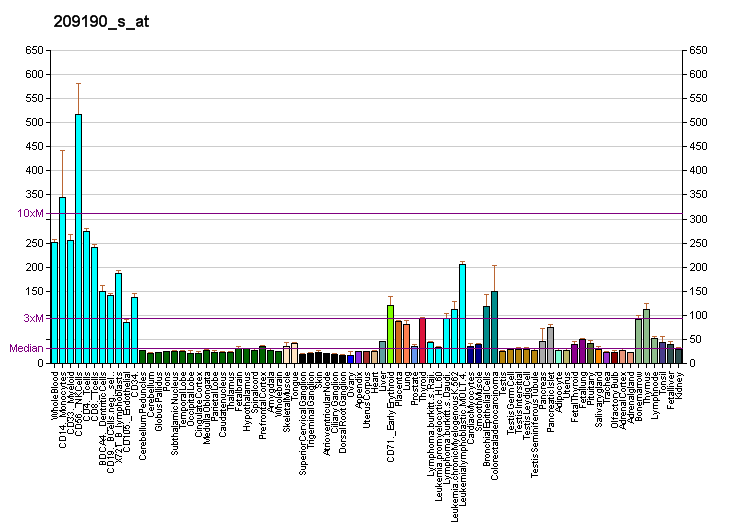

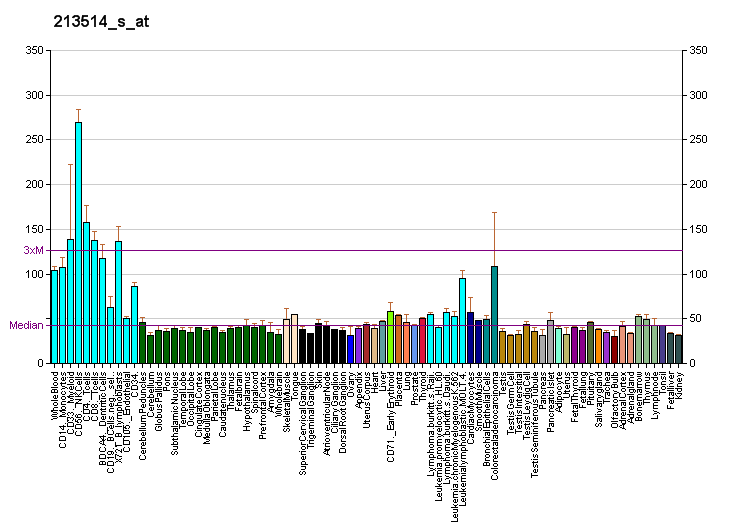
RNA expression pattern
Bgee	Human / Mouse (ortholog); Top expressed in: granulocyte; monocyte; Achilles tendon; right lobe of liver; gastrocnemius muscle; skin of leg; right lung; upper lobe of left lung; blood; amniotic fluid / Top expressed in: granulocyte; ankle; conjunctival fornix; transitional epithelium of urinary bladder; blood; vestibular membrane of cochlear duct; muscle of thigh; knee joint; Rostral migratory stream; soleus muscle; More reference expression data
BioGPS	More reference expression data
Gene ontology
Molecular function	transmembrane transporter binding; protein binding; actin binding; signaling receptor binding; RNA binding
Cellular component	cytoplasm; cytosol; cell projection; membrane; spindle; microtubule organizing center; ruffle membrane; mitotic spindle; cytoskeleton; plasma membrane; secretory granule membrane; ficolin-1-rich granule membrane; nucleus
Biological process	actin filament organization; positive regulation of cell migration; regulation of release of sequestered calcium ion into cytosol; hearing; actin filament polymerization; regulation of microtubule-based process; protein localization to microtubule; cytoskeleton organization; regulation of cell shape; cellular component organization; actin cytoskeleton organization; cellular response to histamine; regulation of cell motility; neutrophil degranulation; regulation of cytoskeleton organization
Sources:Amigo / QuickGO
Orthologs
Databases	NCBI: entry; OMA: entry
Species	Human	Mouse
Entrez	1729	13367
Ensembl	ENSG00000131504	ENSMUSG00000024456
UniProt	O60610	O08808
RefSeq (mRNA)	NM_001314007; NM_001079812; NM_005219	NM_007858; NM_001305980; NM_001305981
RefSeq (protein)	NP_001073280; NP_001300936; NP_005210	NP_001292909; NP_001292910; NP_031884
Location (UCSC)	Chr 5: 141.52 – 141.62 Mb	Chr 18: 37.98 – 38.07 Mb
PubMed search
- Wikidata
View/Edit Human	View/Edit Mouse

Protein diaphanous homolog 1 is a protein that in humans is encoded by the DIAPH1 gene.

== Function ==
This gene is a homolog of the Drosophila diaphanous gene and belongs to the protein family of the formins, characterized by the formin homology 2 (FH2) domain. It has been linked to autosomal dominant, fully penetrant, nonsyndromic low-frequency progressive sensorineural hearing loss. Actin polymerization involves proteins known to interact with diaphanous protein in Drosophila and mouse. It has therefore been speculated that this gene may have a role in the regulation of actin polymerization in hair cells of the inner ear. Alternatively spliced transcript variants encoding distinct isoforms have been found for this gene.

== Interactions ==
DIAPH1 has been shown to interact with RHOA.

== Clinical significance ==
Mutations in this gene have been associated with macrothrombocytopenia and hearing loss, microcephaly, blindness, and early onset seizures

Its actions on platelet formation appear to occur at the level of the megakaryocyte where it is involved in cytoskeleton formation.

== See also ==
- mDia1
