= MDia1 =

Protein

Protein diaphanous homolog 1
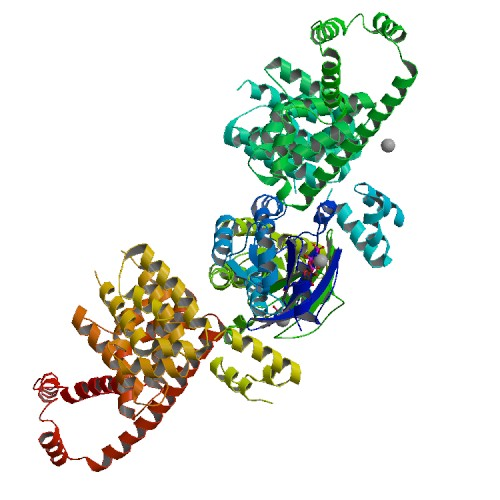
- Crystal structure of mDIA1 GBD-FH3 in complex with RhoC-GMPPNP

Identifiers
- Symbol: mDia1
- Alt. symbols: DRF1
- PDB: 1z2c
- RefSeq: NP_031884.1
- UniProt: o08808
Search for
- Structures: Swiss-model
- Domains: InterPro

mDia1 (also known as Dia1, Drf1 for Diaphanous-related formin-1, Diaph1, KIAA4062, p140mDia, mKIAA4062, or D18Wsu154e) is a member of the protein family called the formins and is a Rho effector. It is the mouse version of the diaphanous homolog 1 of Drosophila. mDia1 localizes to cells' mitotic spindle and midbody, plays a role in stress fiber and filopodia formation, phagocytosis, activation of serum response factor, formation of adherens junctions, and it can act as a transcription factor. mDia1 accelerates actin nucleation and elongation by interacting with barbed ends (fast-growing ends) of actin filaments. The gene encoding mDia1 is located on Chromosome 18 of Mus musculus and named Diap1.

mDia1 is highly homologous to Drosophila diaphanous, regulating the cytokinetic ring during cytokinesis. Homologues in other species are known as well, like the human DIAP1, budding yeast Bni1 or fission yeast Cdc12p.

The gene has been knocked-out in mice.

== Structure ==
Fig. 1 Domains of mDia1 shown with relative differences of lengths

The product of the Diap1 (Diaph1) gene consists of 1255 amino acids resulting in a molecular weight of 139,343 daltons. The mDia1 polypeptide chain can be divided into four protein domains:

- GBD/FH3 (Rho GTPase-binding domain/formin homology 3)domain (366 amino acids long): positions 75-440
- FH1 (formin homology 1) domain (162 amino acids long): positions 586-747
- FH2 (formin homology 2) domain (403 amino acids long): positions 752-1154
- DAD (diaphanous autoregulatory domain) (29 amino acids long): positions 1177-1205

Three supplementary domains were discovered:

- coiled coil (103 amino acids long): positions 460-562
- coiled coil (153 amino acids long): positions 1027-1179
- Arg/Lys-rich domain (4 amino acids long): positions: 1196-1199

The active region of the C terminus consists of formin homology 1 and 2 (FH1 and FH2) and the Dia autoregulatory domain (DAD). The FH1 domain is predicted to be rope-like and it contains binding sites for profilin-actin complexes. The adjacent FH2 domain forms together with the FH2 domain of a second mDia1 molecule a head-to-tail doughnut shaped dimer that encircles the barbed end of an actin filament. Thus the FH2 domain has the ability to dimerize.

The N terminus consists of a Rho GTPase-binding domain (GBD), which is joint to the formin homology 3 (FH3).

DAD can mediate autoinhibition through interactions with the Dia inhibitory domain (DID), which is a subdomain of the GDB/FH3 domain (see section Regulation).

== Regulation ==
Autoinhibition is achieved through binding of the C-terminal DAD to the N-terminal DID. This interaction inhibits the ability of FH2 to nucleate actin assembly. Rho-GTP binds to the GDB domain and disrupts the DAD-DID-interaction thus promoting actin assembly. But this requires high concentrations of Rho-GTP, which may be not physiological. Hence, the release of mDia1 from autoinhibition seems to require nonspecific membrane-associated factors that cooperate with Rho-GTP.

Several binding proteins can regulate mDia1 localization and activity:

- ABI1: Helps to localize mDia1 to lamellipodia, filopodia and cell adhesions
- CLIP 170: Binds the FH2 domain and recruits mDia1 to sites of phagocytosis
- Gα12/13: Helps to localize mDia1 to the leading edge of migrating cells
- RhoA: Required for mDia1 localization to adherens junctions and partially removes mDia's autoinhibition
- RhoB: Helps to localize mDia1 to endosomes

Furthermore the scaffold protein (IQGAP1) seems to impact on mDia1. IQGAP1 regulates the localization of mDia1 to the leading edge to cells. The only tested short C-terminal fragment of IQGAP1 (aa 1503 to 1657) was not activating the mDia1 actin polymerization activity in vitro. However expression of this fragment in macrophages reduced phagocytosis. Thus it remains open if IQGAP1 influences the activity of mDia1 directly like it does for NWASP.

== Mechanism ==
=== Nucleation ===
In contrast to the Arp 2/3 complex, formins nucleate the formation of unbranched actin filaments. FH2 domains lack structural similarity to actin but can bind actin monomers with very weak affinity. The FH2 dimer nucleates filament assembly by interacting directly with and stabilizing actin polymerization intermediates (dimers and trimers).

=== Elongation ===
A formin dimer remains constantly bound to the plus end of an actin filament despite ongoing polymerization. One formin of a dimer dissociates from the barbed end to take the next step while the second formin of the dimer remains bound. Thus the formin dimer processively adds actin monomers to the barbed end and are constantly present at the barbed end of an actin filament (processive capping). The FH1 domain recruits actin monomers through profilin binding, but it does not promote nucleation. Studies demonstrated that FH2 domains protect the rapidly elongating barbed ends of filaments from the vast molar excesses of actin capping proteins. The precise mechanisms of actin filament nucleation remains an area of active investigation.

The rate of FH2 movement while elongation on an actin filament matches the rate of actin subunit addition, which can exceed 100 subunits per second.

Profilin as a ubiquitous actin-binding protein is associated with most actin monomers in cells. Interactions between profilin-actin with the FH1 domain can accelerate the elongation at the FH2-capped barbed ends.

== Function ==
The formin homology protein mDia1 is a Rho GTPase effector protein, which appears to be universally present in eukaryotic cells and participates in:

- Stress fiber formation
- Endocytosis
- Microtubule functions

Stress fibers are acto-myosin structures, which are important for establishment of cellular tension and thus traction to move a cell ahead; the later is mediated via cell adhesions. Stress fibers are bundles of about 20 actin filaments linked via non-muscle myosin II. In vitro studies showed that mDia1 assembled stress fibers downstream of Rho. Live-cell imaging analysis revealed that mDia1 indeed assembles stress fibers, which are connected at one of their ends to focal adhesions, where actin polymerization occurs. Stress fiber assembly at focal adhesions by mDia1 was later shown to promote their growth and stabilization, suggesting mDia1 exerts effects on the interactions of cells with their environment.

Formins regulate endocytosis. mDia 1 localizes to endosomes and regulates phagocytic cup formation in macrophages.

mDia1 (and mDia2) seems to stabilize microtubules by decreasing the tubulin subunit exchange at their plus ends. The exact mechanism is not fully understood yet. However, the affinity of formins for actin are much higher than for microtubules.

By catalyzing actin polymerization and stabilizing microtubules, mDia1 plays also an important role for cell migration.

== Discovery ==
mDia1 was discovered as p140mDia1 by Watanabe et al. in 1997 as a downstream effector of Rho. A mouse embryo cDNA library was screened to identify a RhoA-GTP-binding protein using a yeast two-hybrid system. Further it was shown that p140mDia1 binds to the GTP-bound form of RhoA only by precipitation from Swiss 3T3 cell lysates. Watanabe et al. could also show the interaction of p140mDia1 with profilin and the colocalization of RhoA, p140mDia and profilin in membrane ruffles of motile cells.

A subsequent study in 1997 by Bione et al. established a link between human DIA and oogenesis, with a defect in the gene leading to premature ovarian failure.

== See also ==
- DIAPH1
