= IQGAP2 =

Protein-coding gene in the species Homo sapiens

Identifiers
- Aliases: IQGAP2, IQ motif containing GTPase activating protein 2
- External IDs: OMIM: 605401; MGI: 2449975; GeneCards: IQGAP2
Available structures
PDB	Ortholog search: PDBe RCSB
PDB	List of PDB id codes 3IEZ, 4EZA

Gene location (Human)
Chr.	Chromosome 5 (human)
Band	5q13.3	Start	76,403,285 bp
Band	5q13.3	End	76,708,132 bp

Gene location (Mouse)
Chr.	Chromosome 13 (mouse)
Band	13 D1|13 50.26 cM	Start	95,763,682 bp
Band	13 D1|13 50.26 cM	End	96,028,991 bp
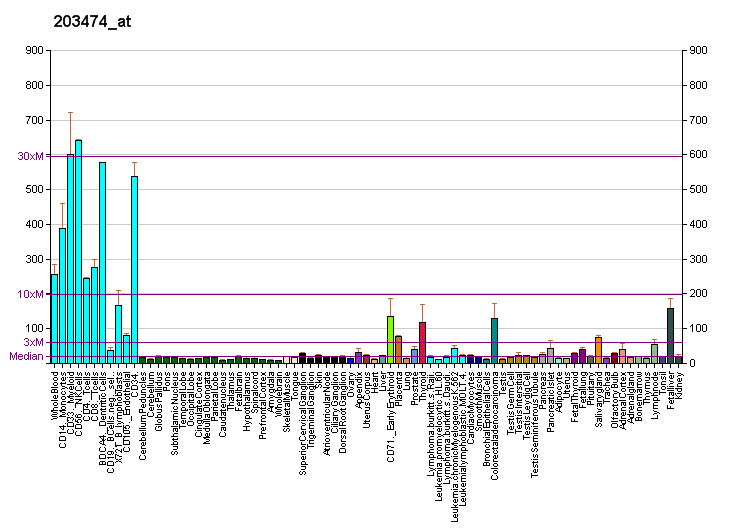
RNA expression pattern
Bgee	Human / Mouse (ortholog); Top expressed in: jejunal mucosa; ventricular zone; glomerulus; metanephric glomerulus; secondary oocyte; liver; right lobe of liver; duodenum; parotid gland; monocyte / Top expressed in: ciliary body; retinal pigment epithelium; parotid gland; iris; left lobe of liver; epithelium of stomach; submandibular gland; left colon; jejunum; lacrimal gland; More reference expression data
BioGPS	More reference expression data
Gene ontology
Molecular function	Arp2/3 complex binding; GTPase inhibitor activity; actin filament binding; actin binding; phosphatidylinositol-3,4,5-trisphosphate binding; calmodulin binding
Cellular component	cytoplasm; filamentous actin; cytosol; filopodium; microvillus; cell surface; actin cytoskeleton; microtubule; extracellular exosome; lamellipodium; plasma membrane; secretory granule membrane
Biological process	thrombin-activated receptor signaling pathway; regulation of GTPase activity; Arp2/3 complex-mediated actin nucleation; signal transduction; negative regulation of GTPase activity; neutrophil degranulation
Sources:Amigo / QuickGO
Orthologs
Databases	NCBI: entry; OMA: entry
Species	Human	Mouse
Entrez	10788	544963
Ensembl	ENSG00000145703	ENSMUSG00000021676
UniProt	Q13576	Q3UQ44
RefSeq (mRNA)	NM_001285460; NM_001285461; NM_001285462; NM_006633	NM_027711
RefSeq (protein)	NP_001272389; NP_001272390; NP_001272391; NP_006624	NP_081987
Location (UCSC)	Chr 5: 76.4 – 76.71 Mb	Chr 13: 95.76 – 96.03 Mb
PubMed search
- Wikidata
View/Edit Human	View/Edit Mouse

Ras GTPase-activating-like protein IQGAP2 is an enzyme that in humans is encoded by the IQGAP2 gene.

== Function ==
This gene encodes a member of the IQGAP family. The protein contains three IQ domains, one calponin homology domain, one Ras-GAP domain and one WW domain. It interacts with components of the cytoskeleton, with cell adhesion molecules, and with several signaling molecules to regulate cell morphology and motility.

== Interactions ==
IQGAP2 has been shown to interact with CDC42 and RAC1.
