= Linitis plastica =

- Other names: Leather bottle stomach
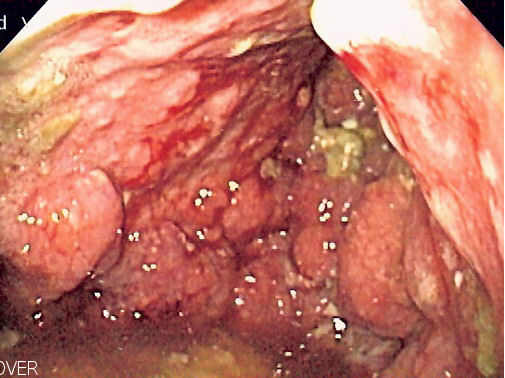
- Endoscopic image of linitis plastica, where the entire stomach is invaded with stomach cancer, leading to a leather bottle like appearance
- Specialty: Oncology

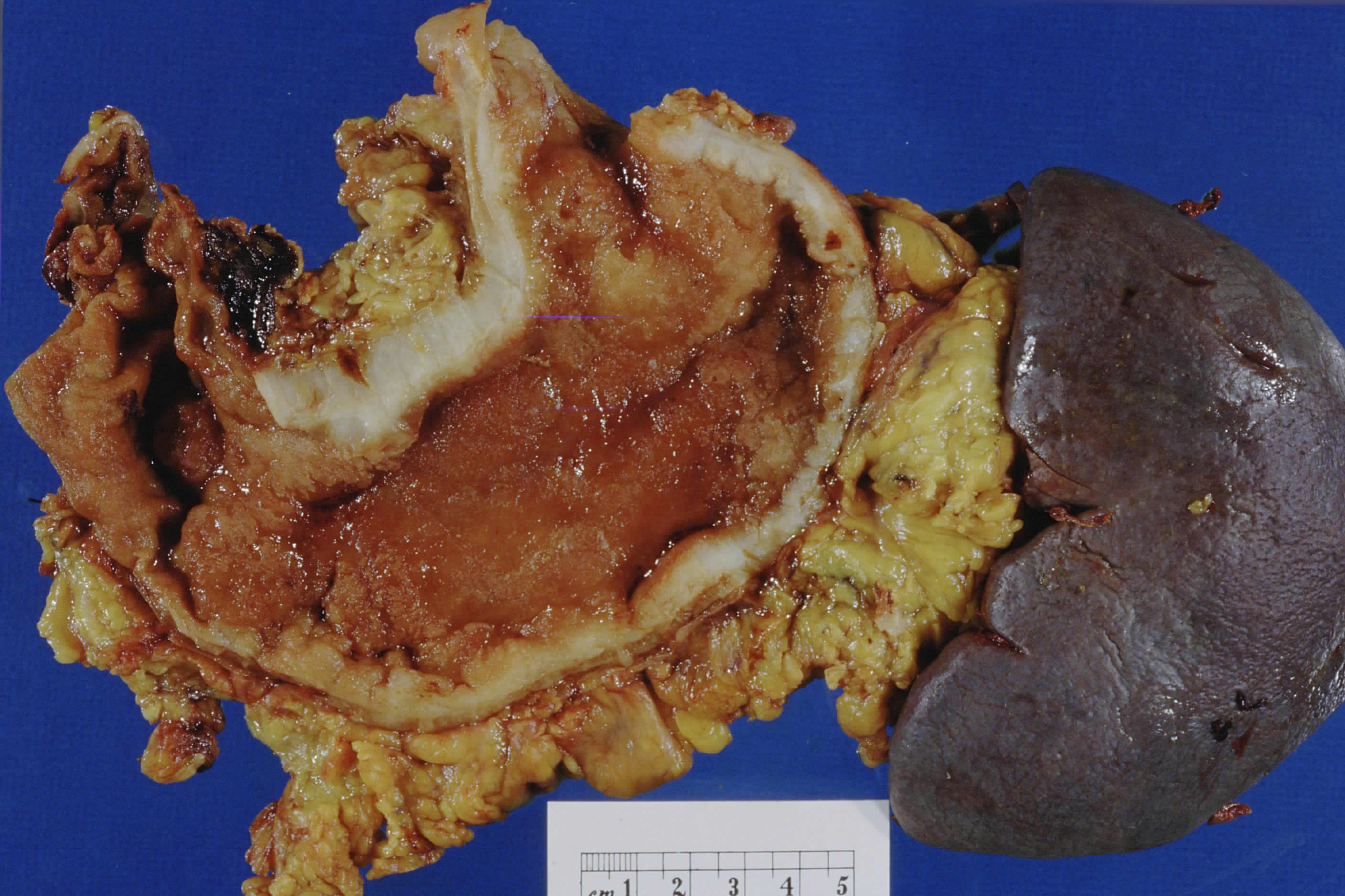
total gastrectomy, splenectomy for infiltrative gastric cancer

Linitis plastica (sometimes referred to as leather bottle stomach) is a morphological variant of diffuse stomach cancer in which the stomach wall becomes thick and rigid.

Linitis plastica is a type of adenocarcinoma and accounts for 3–19% of gastric adenocarcinomas. Causes of cancerous linitis plastica are commonly primary gastric cancer, but in rarer cases could be metastatic infiltration of the stomach, particularly breast and lung carcinoma. It is not associated with H. pylori infection or chronic gastritis. The risk factors are undefined, except for rare inherited mutations in E-cadherin. The hereditary form of this cancer, hereditary diffuse gastric cancer, accounts for only 1–3% of gastric adenocarcinomas. Somatic mutations in this gene are found in about 50% of diffuse-type gastric carcinomas.

== Signs and symptoms ==
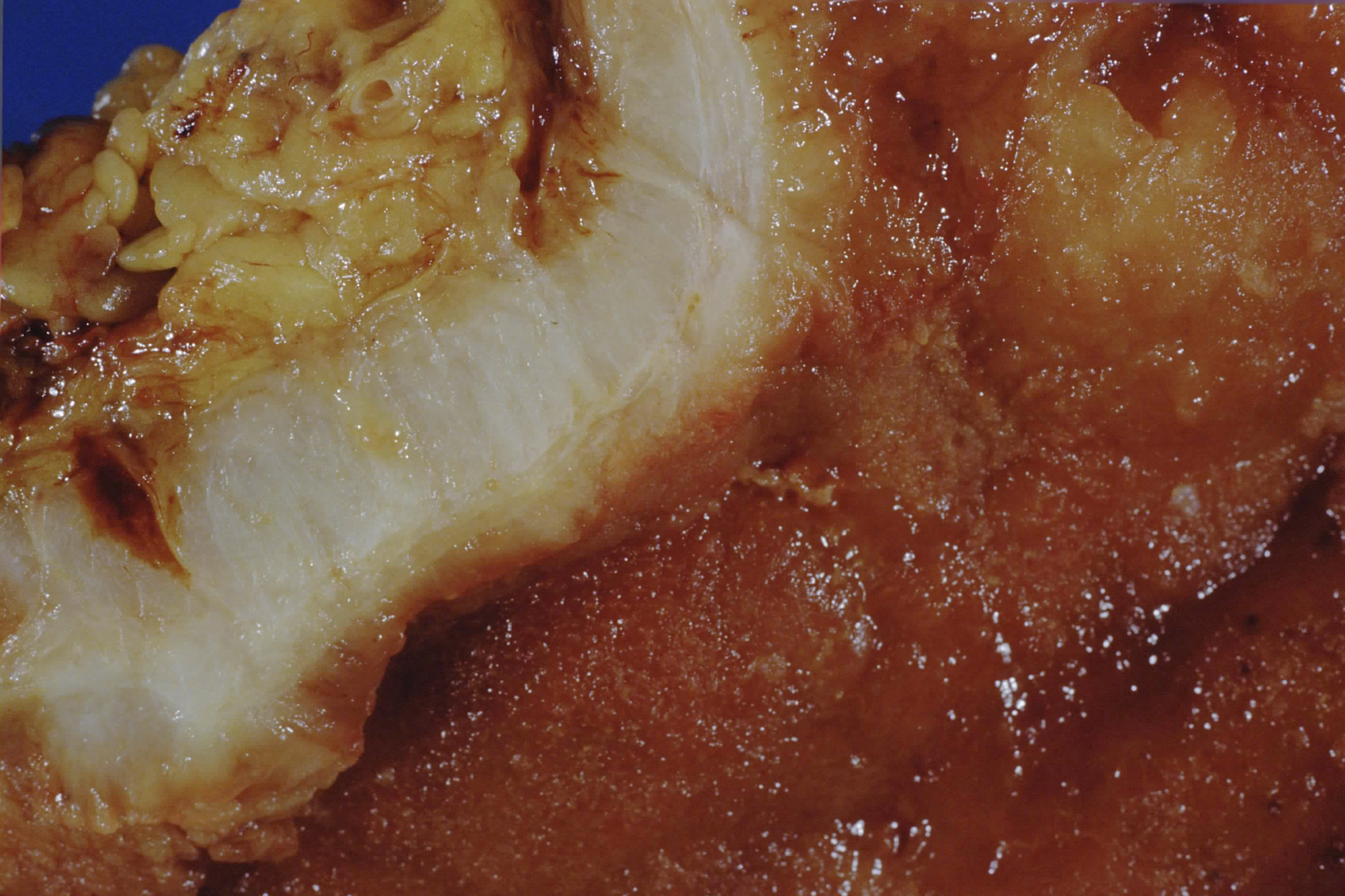
close-up, total gastrectomy, infiltrative gastric cancer

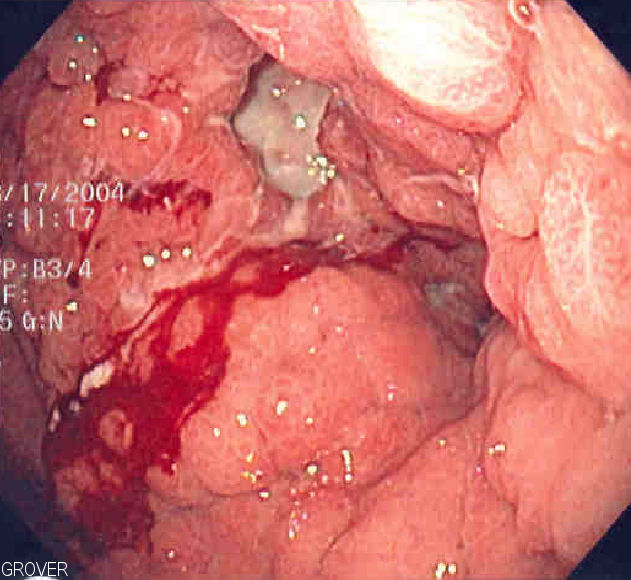
Endoscopic image of linitis plastica, a diffuse type of stomach cancer characterized by a thickening and rigidity of the lining of the stomach, leading to a leather bottle-like appearance with blood coming out of it

Diffuse stomach cancer is characterized by the presence of poorly differentiated tumor cells. Under a microscope, these appear as signet ring cells, meaning that mucin droplets are visible that displace the nucleus to one side.

Symptoms of linitis plastica do not usually present until the disease is in an advanced stage, making early diagnosis difficult. Symptoms are similar to those of stomach cancer including: difficulty swallowing, weight loss, indigestion, and vomiting.

== History ==
The condition was defined by William Brinton in 1859.

== Notable cases ==
Napoleon Bonaparte and many members of his family are thought to have died from this type of cancer, although it is believed by others that he may have died from arsenic poisoning.
