= Stomach cancer =

Cancerous tumor originating in the stomach lining

- Other names: Gastric cancer
- X-ray image of type 2 stomach cancer generated in the upper part of the stomach
- Specialty: Gastroenterology Oncology
- Symptoms: Early: Heartburn; bloating; upper abdominal pain; nausea; belching; loss of appetite; Later: Weight loss; yellowing of the skin and whites of the eyes; vomiting blood; difficulty swallowing; blood in the stool
- Usual onset: Over years
- Types: Gastric carcinomas, lymphoma, mesenchymal tumor
- Causes: Helicobacter pylori, genetics
- Risk factors: Smoking, alcohol, dietary factors such as pickled vegetables, obesity
- Diagnostic method: Biopsy done during endoscopy
- Prevention: Mediterranean diet, not smoking
- Treatment: Surgery, chemotherapy, radiation therapy, targeted therapy
- Prognosis: Five-year survival rate: < 10% (advanced cases), 40% (US, 2016–2022), 71% (Japan)
- Frequency: 968,350 (2022)
- Deaths: 659,853 (2022)

Stomach cancer, also known as gastric cancer, is a malignant tumor of the stomach. It is a cancer that develops in the lining of the stomach, caused by abnormal cell growth. Most cases of stomach cancers are gastric carcinomas, which can be divided into several subtypes, including gastric adenocarcinomas. Lymphomas and mesenchymal tumors may also develop in the stomach. Early symptoms may include heartburn, upper abdominal pain, nausea, and loss of appetite. Later signs and symptoms may include weight loss, yellowing of the skin and whites of the eyes, vomiting, difficulty swallowing, and blood in the stool, among others. The cancer may spread from the stomach to other parts of the body, particularly the liver, lungs, bones, lining of the abdomen, and lymph nodes.

The bacterium Helicobacter pylori accounts for more than 60% of cases of stomach cancer. Certain strains of H. pylori have greater risks than others. Smoking, dietary factors such as pickled vegetables and obesity are other risk factors. About 10% of cases run in families, and between 1% and 3% of cases are due to genetic syndromes inherited such as hereditary diffuse gastric cancer. Most of the time, stomach cancer develops in stages over the years. Diagnosis is usually by biopsy done during endoscopy. This is followed by medical imaging to determine if the cancer has spread to other parts of the body. Japan and South Korea, two countries that have high rates of the disease, screen for stomach cancer.

A Mediterranean diet lowers the risk of stomach cancer, as does not smoking. Tentative evidence indicates that treating H. pylori decreases the future risk. If stomach cancer is treated early, it can be cured. Treatments may include some combination of surgery, chemotherapy, radiation therapy, and targeted therapy. For certain subtypes of gastric cancer, cancer immunotherapy is an option as well. If treated late, palliative care may be advised. Some types of lymphoma can be cured by eliminating H. pylori. Outcomes are often poor, with a less than 10% five-year survival rate in the Western world for advanced cases. Most people with the condition present with advanced disease. In the United States, five-year survival is 39.8%, while in South Korea it is over 65% and Japan over 70%, mostly due to screening efforts.

Globally, stomach cancer is the fifth-leading type of cancer and the third-leading cause of death from cancer, making up 7% of cases and 9% of deaths. In 2018, it newly occurred in 1.03 million people and caused 783,000 deaths. Before the 1930s, it was a leading cause of cancer deaths in the Western world; rates have sharply declined among younger generations in the West, although they remain high for people living in East Asia. The decline in the West is believed to be due to the decline of salted and pickled food consumption, as a result of the development of refrigeration as a method of preserving food. Stomach cancer occurs most commonly in East Asia, followed by Eastern Europe. It occurs twice as often in males as in females.

== Signs and symptoms ==
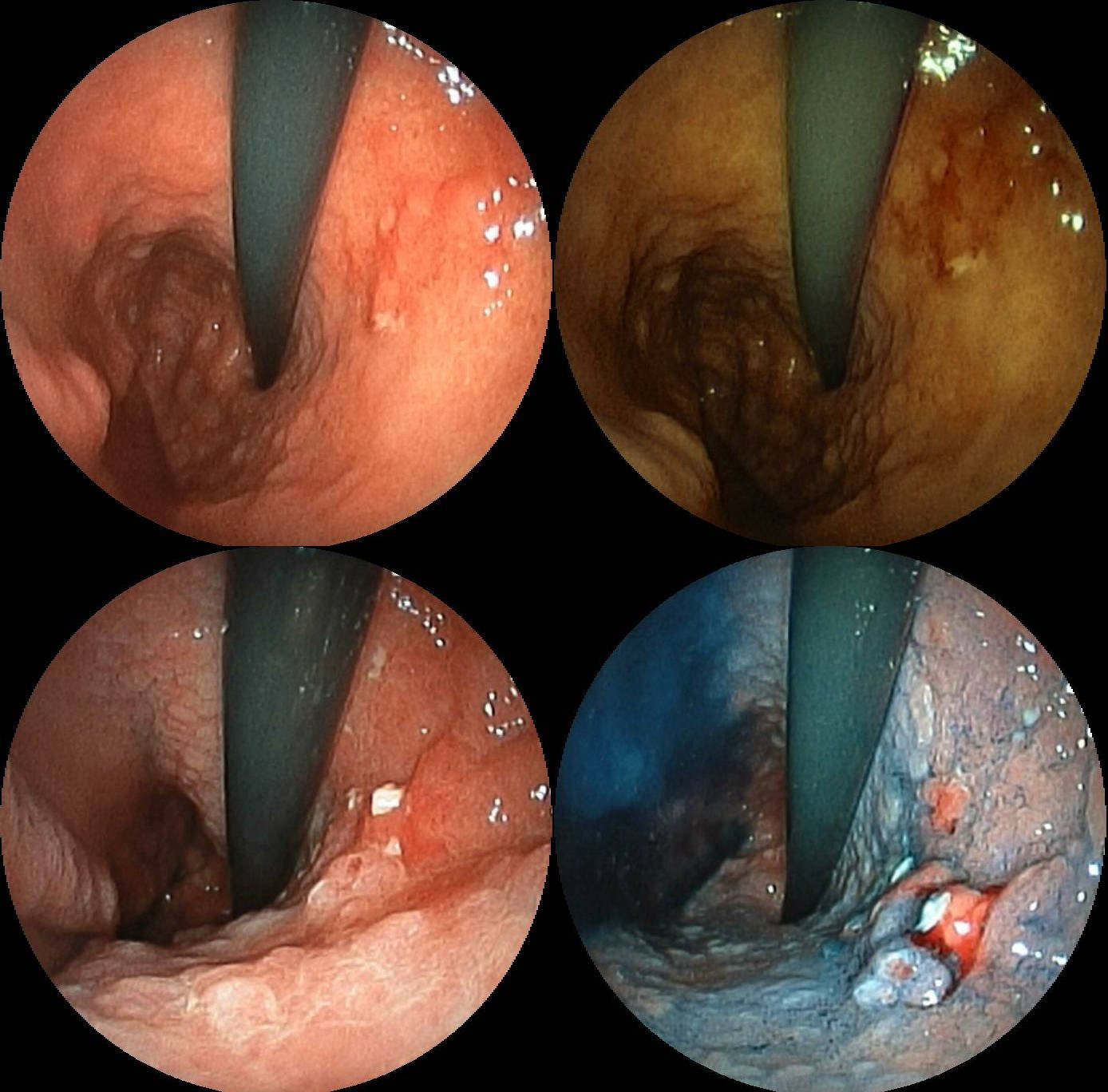
Endoscopic images of the stomach cancer in early stage. Its histology was poorly differentiated adenocarcinoma with signet ring cells. Left above: normal, right above: FICE, left low: acetate stained, right low: AIM stained

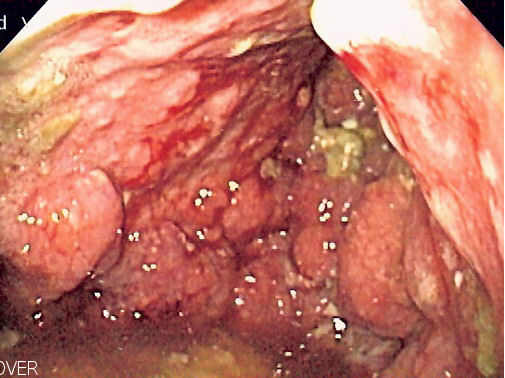
Endoscopic image of linitis plastica, where the entire stomach is invaded with cancer, leading to a leather bottle-like appearance and congealed pus and blood

Stomach cancer is often either asymptomatic (producing no noticeable symptoms) or may cause only nonspecific symptoms (which may also be present in other related or unrelated disorders) in its early stages. By the time symptoms are recognized, the cancer has often reached an advanced stage (see below) and may have metastasized (spread to other, perhaps distant, parts of the body), which is one of the main reasons for its relatively poor prognosis. Stomach cancer can cause the following signs and symptoms: Unexplained nausea, vomiting, diarrhoea, and constipation. Patients can also experience unexplained weight loss.

Early cancers may be associated with indigestion or a burning sensation (heartburn). However, fewer than one in every 50 people referred for endoscopy due to indigestion has cancer. Abdominal discomfort and loss of appetite can occur.

Gastric cancers that have enlarged and invaded normal tissue can cause weakness, fatigue, bloating of the stomach after meals, abdominal pain in the upper abdomen, nausea, and occasional vomiting. Further enlargement may cause weight loss or bleeding, such as vomiting blood or having blood in the stool, the latter apparent as black discolouration (melena) and sometimes leading to anemia. Dysphagia suggests a tumour in the cardia or extension of the gastric tumour into the esophagus.

These can be symptoms of other problems such as a stomach virus, gastric ulcer, or tropical sprue.

== Risk factors ==
Gastric cancer can occur as a result of many factors. It occurs twice as commonly in males as females. Estrogen may protect women against the development of this form of cancer.

=== Infections ===
Helicobacter pylori infection is an essential risk factor in 65–80% of gastric cancers, but only 2% of people with H. pylori infections develop stomach cancer. The mechanism by which H. pylori induces stomach cancer potentially involves chronic inflammation, the action of H. pylori virulence factors such as CagA, or an interaction between H. pylori infection and germline pathogenic variants in homologous-recombination genes. It was estimated that Epstein–Barr virus is responsible for 84,000 cases per year. AIDS is also associated with elevated risk.

=== Smoking ===
Smoking increases the risk of developing gastric cancer significantly, from a 40% increased risk for people who currently smoke to an 82% increase for people who smoke heavily. Gastric cancers due to smoking mostly occur in the upper part of the stomach near the esophagus.

=== Alcohol ===
Some studies show increased risk with alcohol consumption as well.

=== Diet ===
Dietary factors are not proven causes, and the association between stomach cancer and various foods and beverages is weak. Some foods including fried foods, smoked foods, salt and salt-rich foods, meat, processed meat, red meat, pickled vegetables, and brackens are associated with a higher risk of stomach cancer.

Fresh fruit and vegetable intake, citrus fruit intake, and antioxidant intake are associated with a lower risk of stomach cancer. A Mediterranean diet is associated with lower rates of stomach cancer, as is regular aspirin use.

Obesity is a physical risk factor that has been found to increase the risk of gastric adenocarcinoma by contributing to the development of gastroesophageal reflux disease (GERD). The exact mechanism by which obesity causes GERD is not completely known. Studies hypothesize that increased dietary fat, leading to increased pressure on the stomach and the lower esophageal sphincter, due to excess adipose tissue, could play a role, yet no statistically significant data have been collected. However, the risk of gastric cardia adenocarcinoma, with GERD present, has been found to increase more than two times for an obese person. There is a correlation between iodine deficiency and gastric cancer.

=== Genetics ===
About 10% of cases run in families, and between 1 and 3% of cases are due to genetic syndromes inherited such as hereditary diffuse gastric cancer.

A genetic risk factor for gastric cancer is a genetic defect of the CDH1 gene known as hereditary diffuse gastric cancer (HDGC). The CDH1 gene, which codes for E-cadherin, lies on the 16th chromosome. When the gene experiences a particular mutation, gastric cancer develops through a mechanism that is not fully understood. This mutation is considered autosomal dominant, meaning that half of a carrier's children will likely experience the same mutation. Diagnosis of hereditary diffuse gastric cancer usually takes place when at least two cases involving a family member, such as a parent or grandparent, are diagnosed, with at least one diagnosed before the age of 50. The diagnosis can also be made if at least three cases occur in the family, in which case age is not considered.

The International Cancer Genome Consortium is leading efforts to identify genomic changes involved in stomach cancer. A very small percentage of diffuse-type gastric cancers (see Histopathology below) arise from an inherited abnormal CDH1 gene. Genetic testing and treatment options are available for families at risk.

=== Bile reflux ===
Bile reflux, in addition to Helicobacter pylori infection, is a pathogenic factor in gastric intestinal metaplasia, a precancerous lesion of gastric cancer. Long-term irritation of the gastric mucosa caused by bile reflux appears to have a role in gastric carcinogenesis. Bile acids, which are a significant component of bile reflux, may be a causal factor in gastric carcinogenesis.

== Diagnosis ==
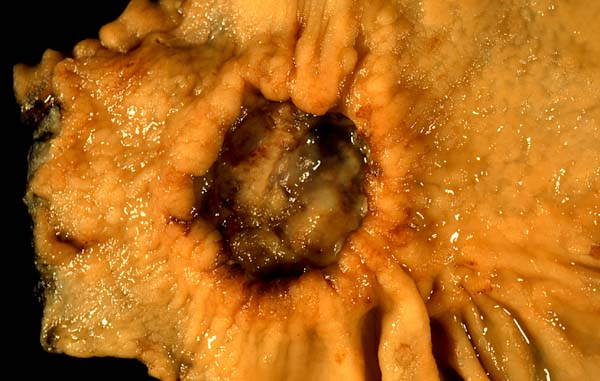
A stomach ulcer that was diagnosed as cancer on biopsy

To find the cause of symptoms, the doctor asks about the patient's medical history, does a physical examination, and may order laboratory studies. The patient may also have one or all of these exams:

- Gastroscopic exam is the diagnostic method of choice. This involves inserting a fibre optic camera into the stomach to visualise it.
- Upper GI series (may be called barium roentgenogram)
- Computed tomography or CT scanning of the abdomen may reveal gastric cancer. It is more useful to determine invasion into adjacent tissues or the presence of spread to local lymph nodes. Wall thickening of more than 1 cm that is focal, eccentric, and enhancing favours malignancy.

In 2013, Chinese and Israeli scientists reported a successful pilot study of a breathalyzer-style breath test intended to diagnose stomach cancer by analyzing exhaled chemicals without the need for an intrusive endoscopy. A larger-scale clinical trial of this technology was completed in 2014.

Abnormal tissue seen in a gastroscope examination is biopsied by the surgeon or gastroenterologist. This tissue is then sent to a pathologist for histological examination under a microscope to check for cancerous cells. A biopsy, with subsequent histological analysis, is the only sure way to confirm the presence of cancer cells.

Various gastroscopic modalities have been developed to increase the yield of detected mucosa with a dye that accentuates the cell structure and can identify areas of dysplasia. Endocytoscopy involves ultra-high magnification to visualise cellular structure and determine areas of dysplasia more effectively. Other gastroscopic modalities such as optical coherence tomography are being investigated for similar applications.

Several skin conditions are associated with gastric cancer. A condition of darkened hyperplasia of the skin, frequently of the axilla and groin, known as acanthosis nigricans, is associated with intra-abdominal cancers such as gastric cancer. Other cutaneous manifestations of gastric cancer include "tripe palms" (a similar darkening hyperplasia of the skin of the palms) and the Leser-Trelat sign, which is the rapid development of skin lesions known as seborrheic keratoses.

Various blood tests may be done, including a complete blood count to check for anaemia, and a fecal occult blood test to check for blood in the stool.

=== Histopathology ===
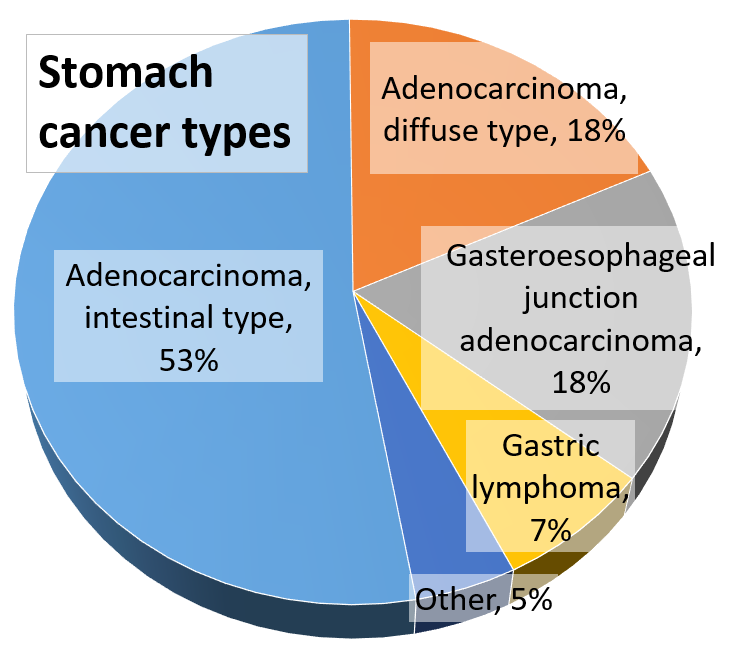
Stomach cancer types by relative incidence

- Gastric adenocarcinoma is a malignant epithelial tumour, originating from the glandular epithelium of the gastric mucosa. Stomach cancers are about 90% adenocarcinomas. Histologically, there are two major types of gastric adenocarcinoma (Lauren classification): intestinal type or diffuse type (now usually described as poorly cohesive gastric carcinoma). Adenocarcinomas tend to aggressively invade the gastric wall, infiltrating the muscularis mucosae, the submucosa, and then the muscularis propria. Intestinal-type adenocarcinoma tumour cells describe irregular tubular structures, harbouring pluristratification, multiple lumens, and reduced stroma ("back to back" aspect). Often, it is associated with intestinal metaplasia in neighbouring mucosa. Depending on glandular architecture, cellular pleomorphism, and mucosecretion, adenocarcinoma may present 3 degrees of differentiation: well, moderate, and poorly differentiated. Diffuse type adenocarcinoma (mucinous, colloid, linitis plastica or leather-bottle stomach) tumour cells are discohesive and secrete mucus, which is delivered in the interstitium, producing large pools of mucus/colloid (optically "empty" spaces). It is poorly differentiated. In signet ring cell carcinomas, the mucus remains inside the tumour cell and pushes the nucleus to the periphery, giving rise to signet-ring cells.
- Around 5% of gastric cancers are lymphomas. These may include extranodal marginal zone B-cell lymphomas (MALT type) and to a lesser extent diffuse large B-cell lymphomas. MALT type make up about half of stomach lymphomas.
- Carcinoid and stromal tumors may occur.
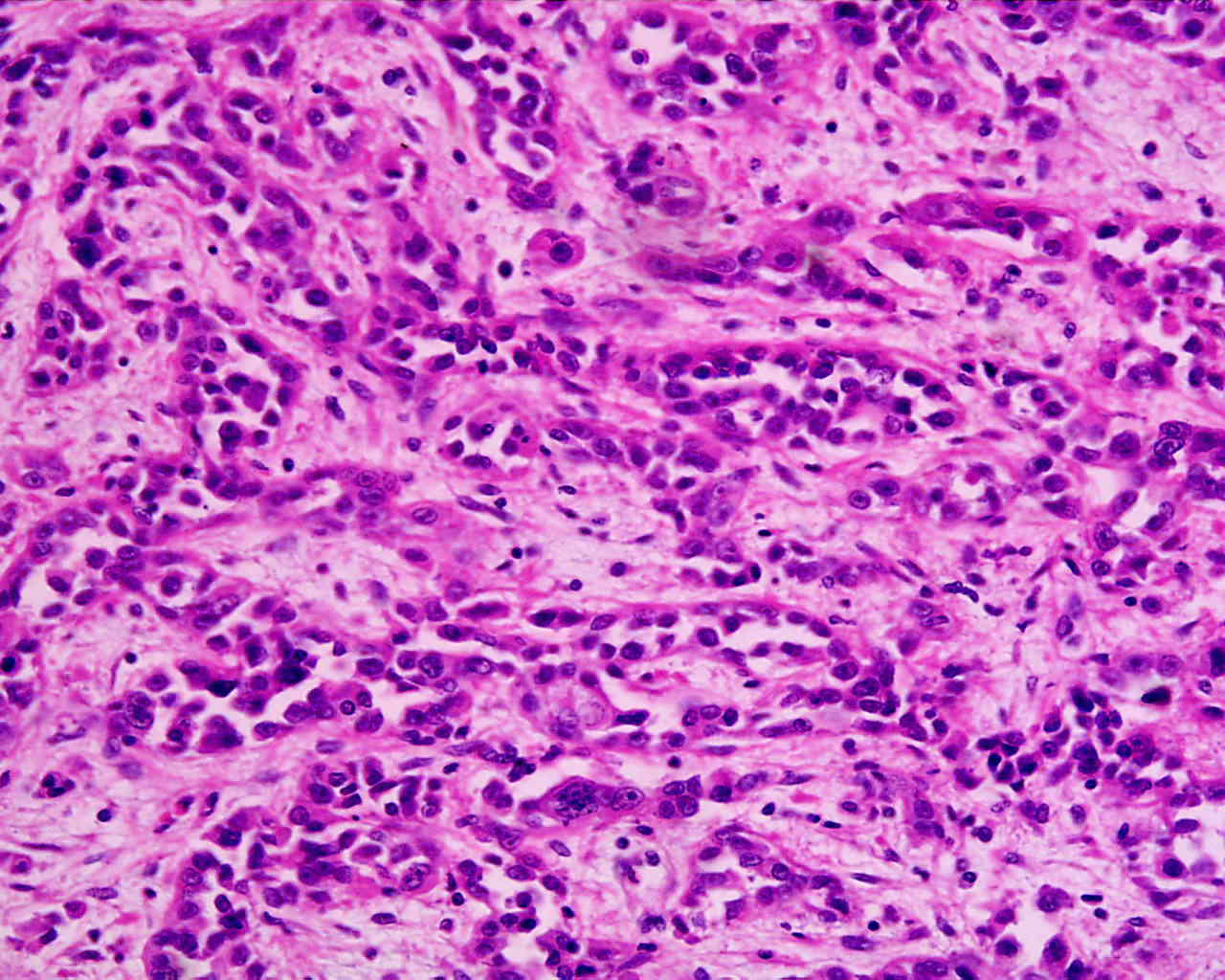
Poor to moderately differentiated adenocarcinoma of the stomach. H&E stain.

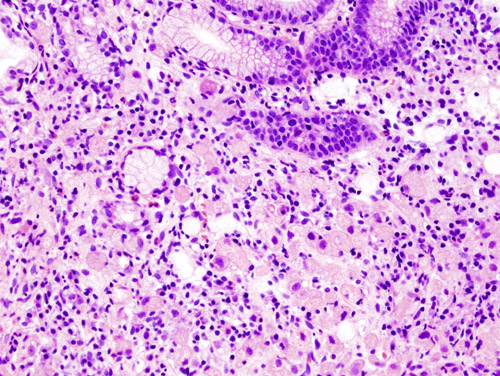
Gastric signet ring cell carcinoma. H&E stain.

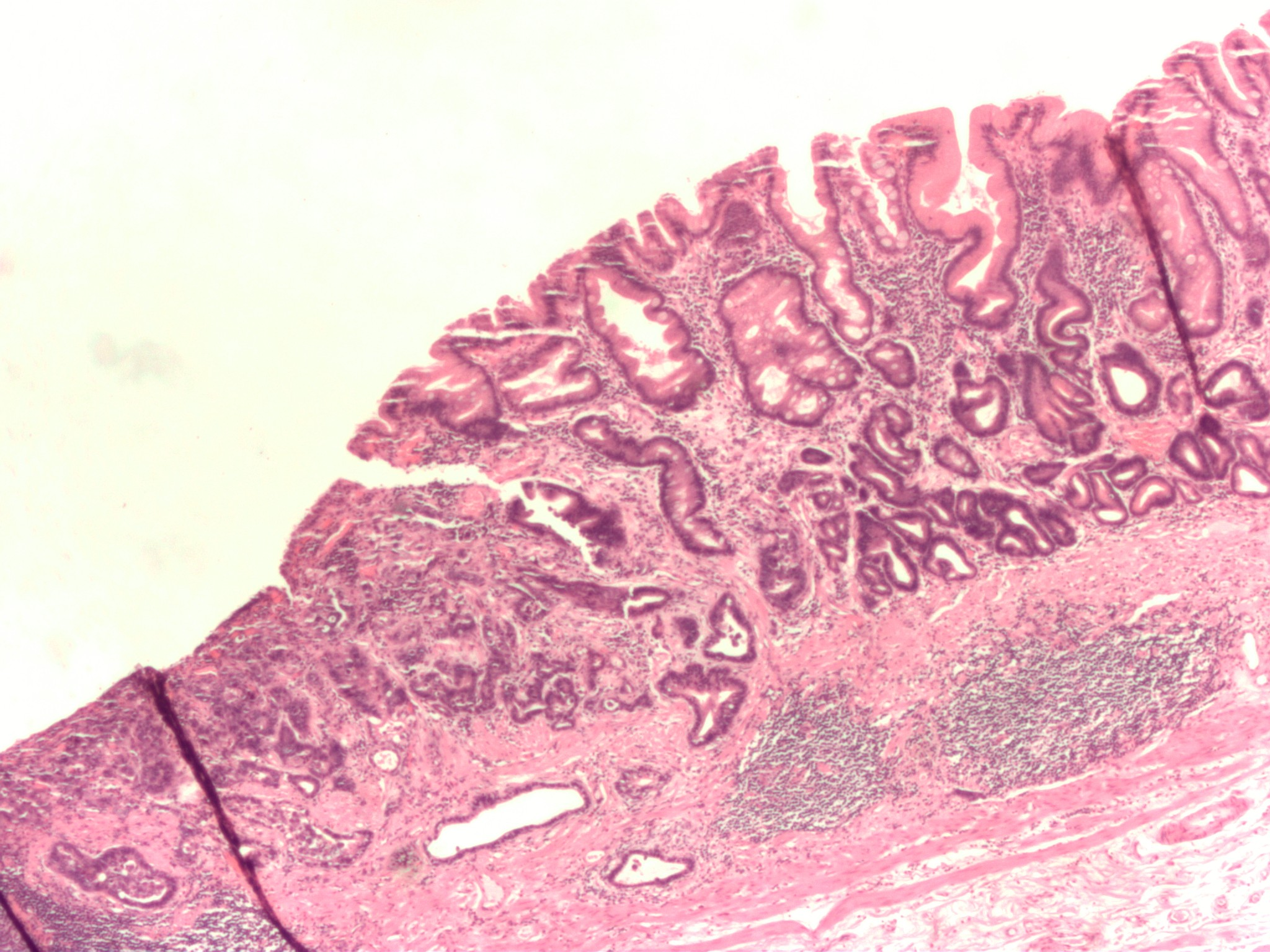
Adenocarcinoma of the stomach and intestinal metaplasia. H&E stain.

=== Staging ===
T stages of stomach cancer

If cancer cells are found in the tissue sample, the next step is to stage, or find out the extent of the disease. Various tests determine whether the cancer has spread, and if so, which parts of the body are affected. Because stomach cancer can spread to the liver, pancreas, and other organs near the stomach, as well as to the lungs, the doctor may order a CT scan, a PET scan, an endoscopic ultrasound exam, or other tests to check these areas. Blood tests for tumor markers, such as carcinoembryonic antigen and carbohydrate antigen, may be ordered, as their levels correlate with the extent of metastasis, especially to the liver, and the cure rate.

Staging may not be complete until after surgery. The surgeon removes nearby lymph nodes and possibly samples of tissue from other areas in the abdomen for examination by a pathologist.

The clinical stages of stomach cancer are:

- Stage 0 – Limited to the inner lining of the stomach, it is treatable by endoscopic mucosal resection when found very early (in routine screenings), or otherwise by gastrectomy and lymphadenectomy without need for chemotherapy or radiation.
- Stage I – Penetration to the second or third layers of the stomach (stage 1A) or to the second layer and nearby lymph nodes (stage 1B): Stage 1A is treated by surgery, including removal of the omentum. Stage 1B may be treated with chemotherapy (5-fluorouracil) and radiation therapy.
- Stage II – Penetration to the second layer and more distant lymph nodes, or the third layer and only nearby lymph nodes, or all four layers but not the lymph nodes, it is treated as for stage I, sometimes with additional neoadjuvant chemotherapy.
- Stage III – Penetration to the third layer and more distant lymph nodes, or penetration to the fourth layer and either nearby tissues or nearby or more distant lymph nodes, it is treated as for stage II; a cure is still possible in some cases.
- Stage IV – Cancer has spread to nearby tissues and more distant lymph nodes, or has metastasized to other organs. A cure is very rarely possible at this stage. Some other techniques to prolong life or improve symptoms are used, including laser treatment, surgery, and/or stents to keep the digestive tract open, and chemotherapy by drugs such as 5-fluorouracil, cisplatin, epirubicin, etoposide, docetaxel, oxaliplatin, capecitabine, or irinotecan.

Stomach cancer metastasized to the lungs

The TNM staging system is also used.

In a study of open-access endoscopy in Scotland, patients were diagnosed 7% in stage I, 17% in stage II, and 28% in stage III. A Minnesota population was diagnosed 10% in stage I, 13% in stage II, and 18% in stage III. However, in a high-risk population in the Valdivia Province of southern Chile, only 5% of patients were diagnosed in the first two stages and 10% in stage III.

== Prevention ==
Getting rid of H. pylori in those who are infected decreases the risk of stomach cancer. A 2014 meta-analysis of observational studies found that a diet high in fruits, mushrooms, garlic, soybeans, and green onions was associated with a lower risk of stomach cancer in the Korean population. Low doses of vitamin, especially from a healthy diet, decrease the risk of stomach cancer. A previous review of antioxidant supplementation did not find supporting evidence and possibly worse outcomes. Modern technology is used to promote early diagnosis, e.g., based on serum markers. Recent reviews have explored the potential role of naturally derived compounds, such as diterpenes, in the prevention and treatment of gastric cancer.

== Management ==
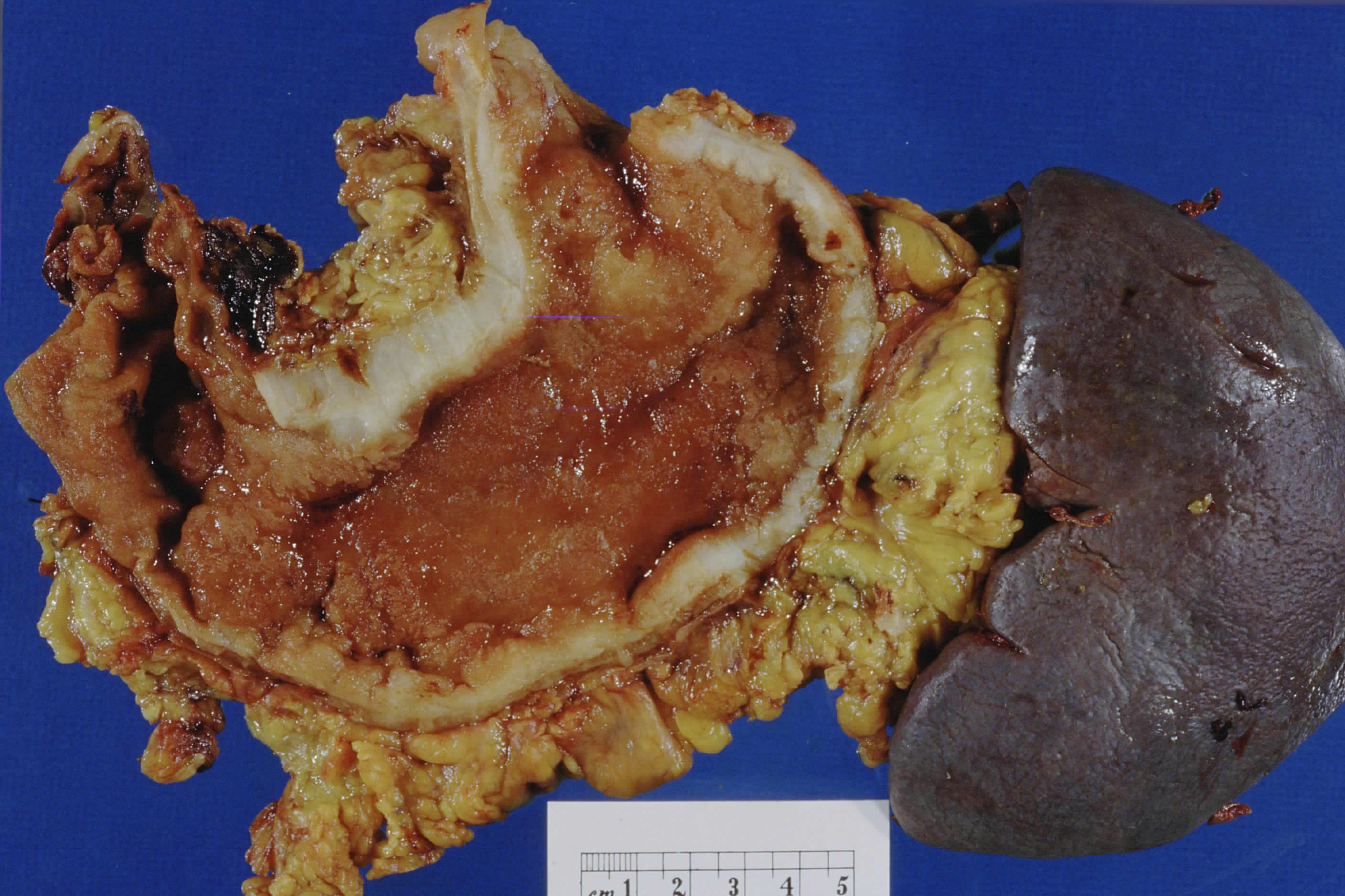
A gross anatomy specimen of a total gastrectomy, splenectomy for infiltrative gastric cancer

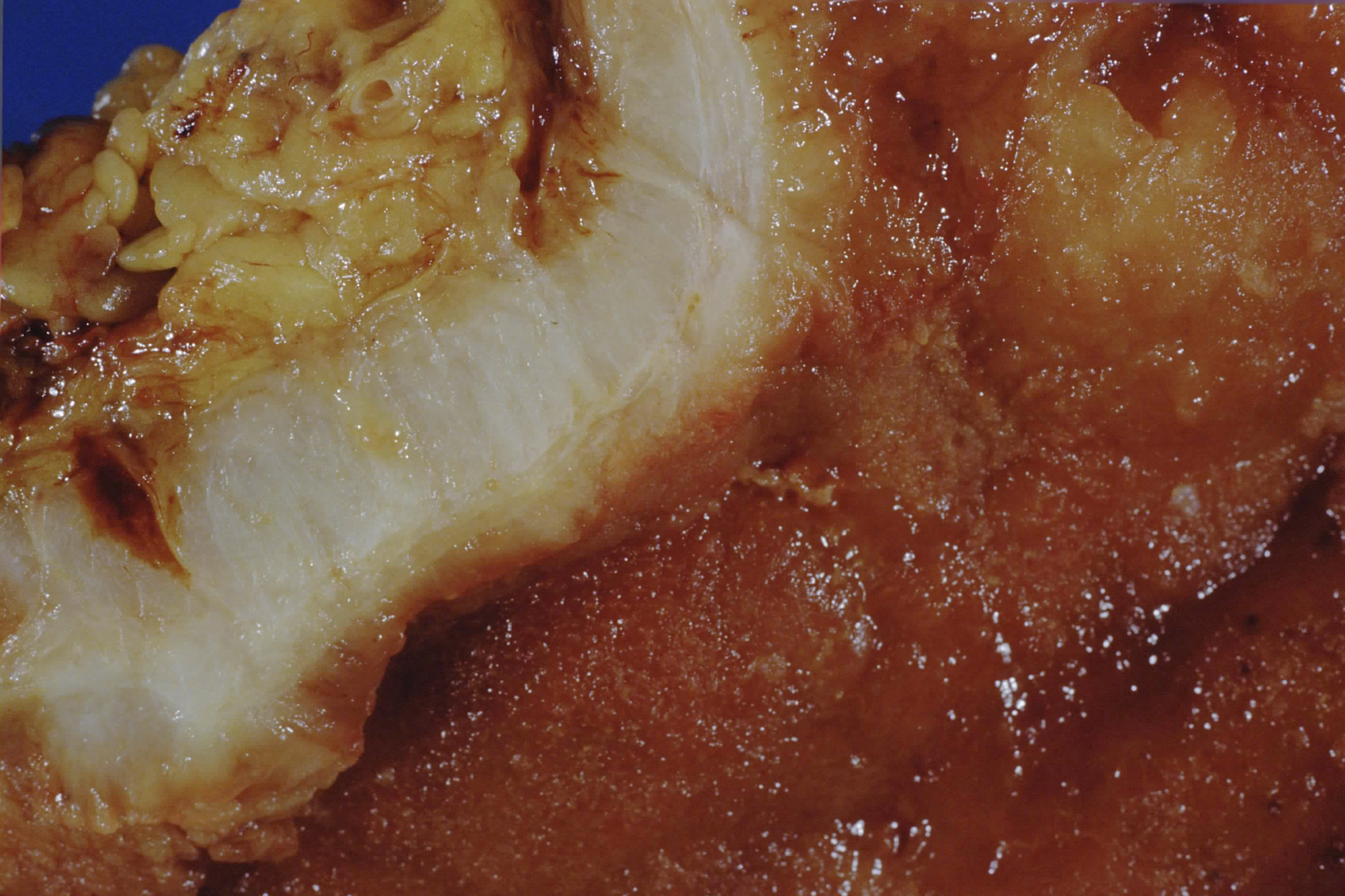
The same picture, close-up, total gastrectomy, infiltrative gastric cancer

Stomach cancer is difficult to cure unless it is found at an early stage (before it has begun to spread). Unfortunately, because early stomach cancer causes few symptoms, the disease is usually advanced when the diagnosis is made.

Treatment for stomach cancer may include surgery, chemotherapy, or radiation therapy. New treatment approaches such as immunotherapy or gene therapy and improved ways of using current methods are being studied in clinical trials.

=== Surgery ===
Anatomy before Roux-en-y surgery to resect stomach cancer

Surgery remains the only curative therapy for stomach cancer. A 2016 Cochrane review found low-quality evidence of no difference in short-term mortality between laparoscopic and open gastrectomy (removal of stomach), and that the benefits or harms of laparoscopic gastrectomy cannot be ruled out. Post-operatively, up to 70% of people undergoing total gastrectomy develop complications such as dumping syndrome and reflux esophagitis.

Construction of a "pouch", which serves as a "stomach substitute", reduced the incidence of dumping syndrome and reflux esophagitis by 73% and 63%, respectively, and led to improvements in quality of life, nutritional outcomes, and body mass index. Proximal gastrectomy can be considered a viable alternative for upper third early gastric cancer. Of the different surgical techniques, endoscopic mucosal resection is a treatment for early gastric cancer in which the tumor within the mucosa is removed using an electrical wire loop through the endoscope, providing a much smaller operation than removing the stomach, first published in 1974 ( Deyhle, P. et al.: Endoscopic snare ectomy of an early gastric cancer - a therapeutical method? Endoscopy 6, 196 - 198, 1974 ). Endoscopic submucosal dissection is a similar technique used to resect a large area of mucosa in one piece. If the pathology examination of the resected specimen shows incomplete resection or deep invasion by tumor, the patient would need a formal stomach resection. Uncut Roux-en-Y reconstruction after distal gastrectomy shows similar rates of major complications and anastomotic leakage compared with Billroth II and standard Roux-en-Y reconstruction. It may reduce the risk of bile reflux compared with Billroth II but increase it compared with Roux-en-Y.

Those with metastatic disease at the time of presentation may receive palliative surgery. While it remains controversial, due to the possibility of complications from the surgery itself and because it may delay chemotherapy, the data so far are mostly positive, with improved survival rates being seen in those treated with this approach.

=== Chemotherapy ===
Combination chemotherapy has been shown to improve overall survival compared with best supportive care in advanced gastric cancer, although the benefit remains modest and treatment is associated with increased toxicity. The use of chemotherapy to treat stomach cancer has no firmly established standard of care. Unfortunately, stomach cancer has not been particularly sensitive to these drugs, and chemotherapy, if used, has usually served to palliatively reduce the size of the tumor, relieve symptoms of the disease, and increase survival time. Some drugs used in stomach cancer treatment have included: fluorouracil or its analog capecitabine, BCNU (carmustine), methyl-CCNU (semustine) and doxorubicin (Adriamycin), as well as mitomycin C, and more recently cisplatin and taxotere, often using drugs in various combinations. The relative benefits of these different drugs, alone and in combination, are unclear. Clinical researchers are exploring the benefits of giving chemotherapy before surgery to shrink the tumor, or as adjuvant therapy after surgery to destroy remaining cancer cells.

=== Targeted therapy ===
Treatment with the human epidermal growth factor receptor 2 (HER2) inhibitor trastuzumab has been demonstrated to increase overall survival in inoperable locally advanced or metastatic gastric carcinoma over-expressing the HER2/neu gene. In particular, HER2 is overexpressed in 13–22% of patients with gastric cancer. Of note, HER2 overexpression in gastric neoplasia is heterogeneous and comprises a minority of tumor cells (less than 10% of gastric cancers overexpress HER2 in more than 5% of tumor cells). Hence, this heterogeneous expression should be taken into account for HER2 testing, particularly in small samples such as biopsies, requiring the evaluation of more than one biopsied sample.

A recent clinical study reported promising results for a combination therapy using nivolumab and catequentinib (anlotinib) in the treatment of advanced gastric adenocarcinoma (GAC) and esophageal squamous cell carcinoma (ESCC), which improves the immune response against cancer while simultaneously slowing tumor progression. The research, conducted by Zhongshan Hospital, Fudan University, and BGI Genomics, was published in Nature Communications in October 2024. The study evaluated the efficacy of combining Nivolumab, an immunotherapy that enhances the immune system's ability to attack cancer cells, with anlotinib hydrochloride. This drug inhibits tumor angiogenesis by blocking signals essential for the growth of new blood vessels.

=== Radiation ===
Radiation therapy (also called radiotherapy) may be used to treat stomach cancer, often as an adjuvant to chemotherapy and/or surgery.

=== Lymphoma ===
MALT lymphomas are often completely resolved after the underlying H. pylori infection is treated. This results in remission in about 80% of cases.

== Prognosis ==
Stomach cancer death rate

The prognosis of stomach cancer is generally poor, because the tumor has often metastasized by the time of discovery, and most people with the condition are elderly (median age is between 70 and 75 years) at presentation. The average life expectancy after being diagnosed was around 24 months, and the five-year survival rate for stomach cancer was less than 10%. Since 1950, there has been a huge reduction in stomach cancer mortality across the world, and mortality has dropped by more than 70% between 1980 and 2023.

Almost 300 genes are associated with outcomes in stomach cancer, with both unfavorable genes, where high expression is associated with poor survival, and favorable genes, where high expression is associated with longer survival times. Examples of poor prognosis genes include ITGAV, DUSP1 and P2RX7.

== Epidemiology ==
In 2018, stomach cancer was the fifth most frequently diagnosed cancer worldwide, representing 5.7% of all cancer cases, and the third leading cause of death from cancers, being responsible for 8.2% of all cancer deaths. Among men, 683,754 cases were diagnosed, accounting for 7.2% of all cancer cases, and among women, stomach cancer was diagnosed in 349,947 cases, accounting for 4.1% of all cancer cases.

In 2012, stomach cancer was the fifth most-common cancer with 952,000 cases diagnosed. It is more common both in men and in developing countries. In 2012, it represented 8.5% of cancer cases in men, making it the fourth most-common cancer in men. Also in 2012, the number of deaths was 700,000, having decreased slightly from 774,000 in 1990, making it the third-leading cause of cancer-related death (after lung cancer and liver cancer).

Less than 5% of stomach cancers occur in people under 40 years of age, with 81.1% of that 5% in the age-group of 30 to 39 and 18.9% in the age-group of 20 to 29.

In 2014, stomach cancer resulted in 0.61% of deaths (13,303 cases) in the United States. In China, stomach cancer accounted for 3.56% of all deaths (324,439 cases). The highest rate of stomach cancer was in Mongolia, at 28 cases per 100,000 people.

In the United Kingdom, stomach cancer is the 15th most common cancer (around 7,100 people were diagnosed with stomach cancer in 2011), and it is the 10th most common cause of cancer-related deaths (around 4,800 people died in 2012).

Incidence and mortality rates of gastric cancer vary greatly in Africa. The GLOBOCAN system is currently the most widely used method for comparing these rates between countries. African incidence and mortality rates are seen to differ among countries, possibly due to the lack of universal access to a registry system for all countries. Variation as drastic as estimated rates from 0.3/100000 in Botswana to 20.3/100000 in Mali have been observed. In Uganda, the incidence of gastric cancer has increased from the 1960s measurement of 0.8/100000 to 5.6/100000. Gastric cancer, though present, is relatively low when compared to countries with high incidence like Japan and China. One suspected cause of variation within Africa and between other countries is different strains of the H. pylori bacteria. The trend commonly seen is that H. pylori infection increases the risk for gastric cancer, but this is not the case in Africa, giving this phenomenon the name the "African enigma". Although this bacterial species is found in Africa, evidence has supported that different strains with mutations in the bacterial genotype may contribute to the difference in cancer development between African countries and others outside the continent. Increasing access to healthcare and treatment measures has been commonly associated with the rising incidence, though, particularly in Uganda.

== Other animals ==
The stomach is a muscular organ of the gastrointestinal tract that holds food and begins the digestive process by secreting gastric juice. The most common cancers of the stomach are adenocarcinomas, but other histological types have been reported. Signs vary, but may include vomiting (especially if blood is present), weight loss, anemia, and lack of appetite. Bowel movements may be dark and tarry. To determine whether cancer is present in the stomach, special X-rays and/or abdominal ultrasounds may be performed. Gastroscopy, a test using an endoscope to examine the stomach, is a useful diagnostic tool that can also take samples of the suspected mass for histopathological analysis to confirm or rule out cancer. The most definitive method of cancer diagnosis is through open surgical biopsy.
