= Signet ring cell =

Cell with a large vacuole

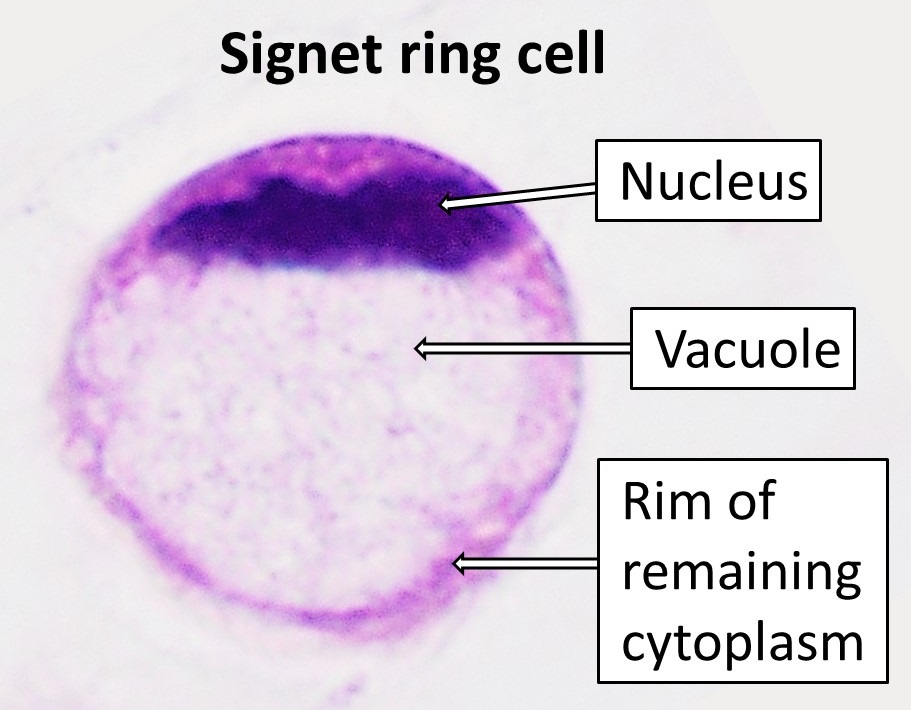
Signet ring cell, as seen in a case of colon adenocarcinoma with mucinous features, showing a tumor cell with a vacuole of mucin. H&E stain.

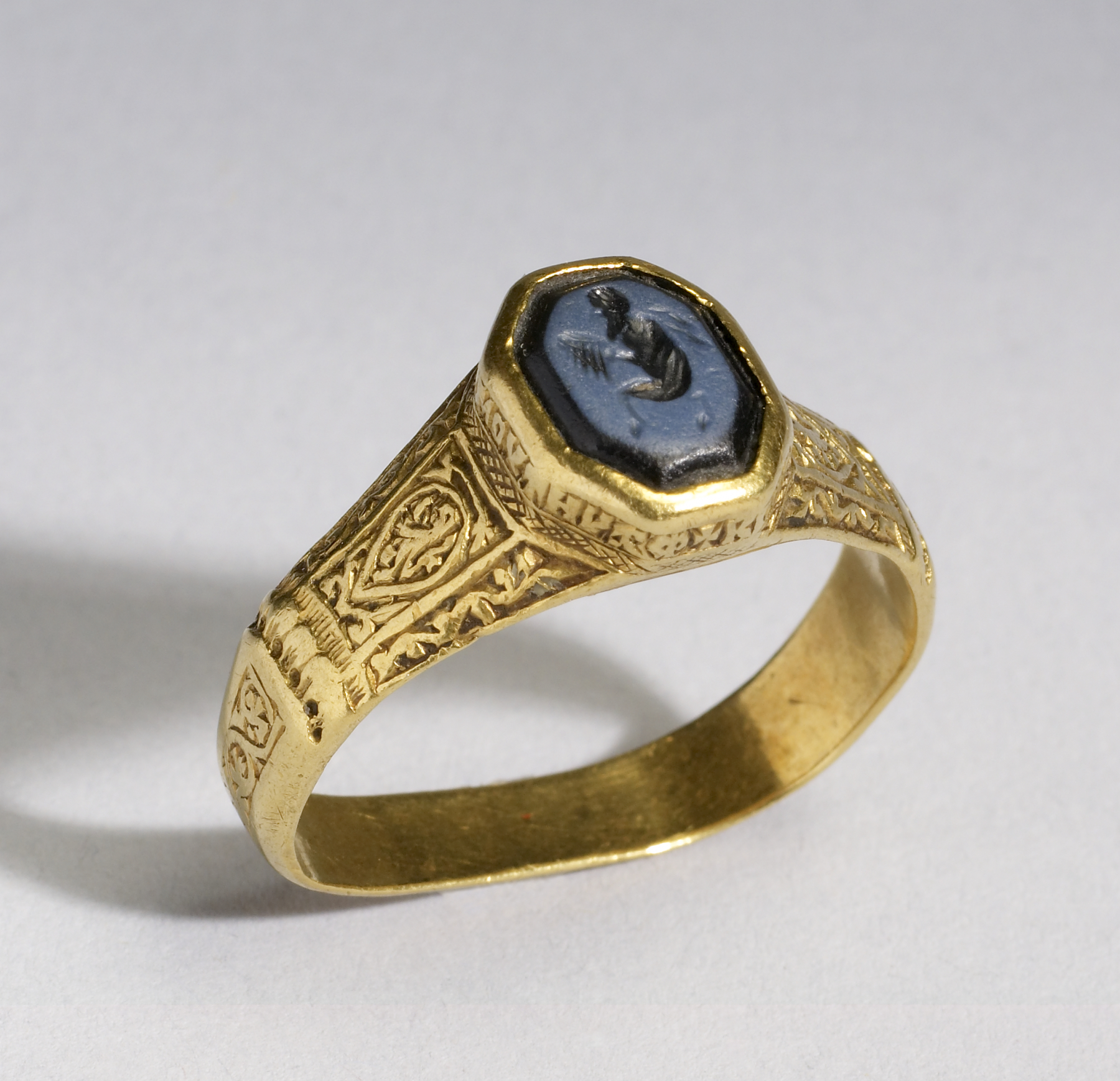
Signet ring for comparison.

In histology, a signet ring cell is a cell with a large vacuole. The malignant type is seen predominantly in carcinomas. Signet ring cells are most frequently associated with stomach cancer, but can arise from any number of tissues including the prostate, bladder, gallbladder, breast, colon, ovarian stroma and testis.

== Types ==
The NCI Thesaurus identifies the following types of signet ring cell

- Castration cell, a non-malignant cell arising in the anterior pituitary gland under certain abnormal hormonal conditions.
- Neoplastic thyroid gland follicular signet ring cell
- Signet ring adenocarcinoma cell
- Signet ring melanoma cell
- Signet ring stromal cell

== Appearance ==
The name of the cell comes from its appearance; signet ring cells resemble signet rings. They contain a large amount of mucin, which pushes the nucleus to the cell periphery. The pool of mucin in a signet ring cell mimics the appearance of a finger hole and the nucleus mimics the appearance of the face of the ring in profile.

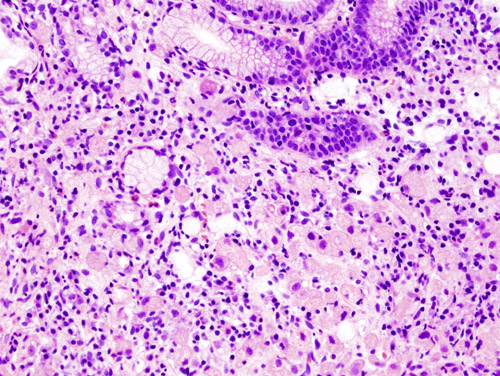
Gastric signet ring cell carcinoma. H&E stain.

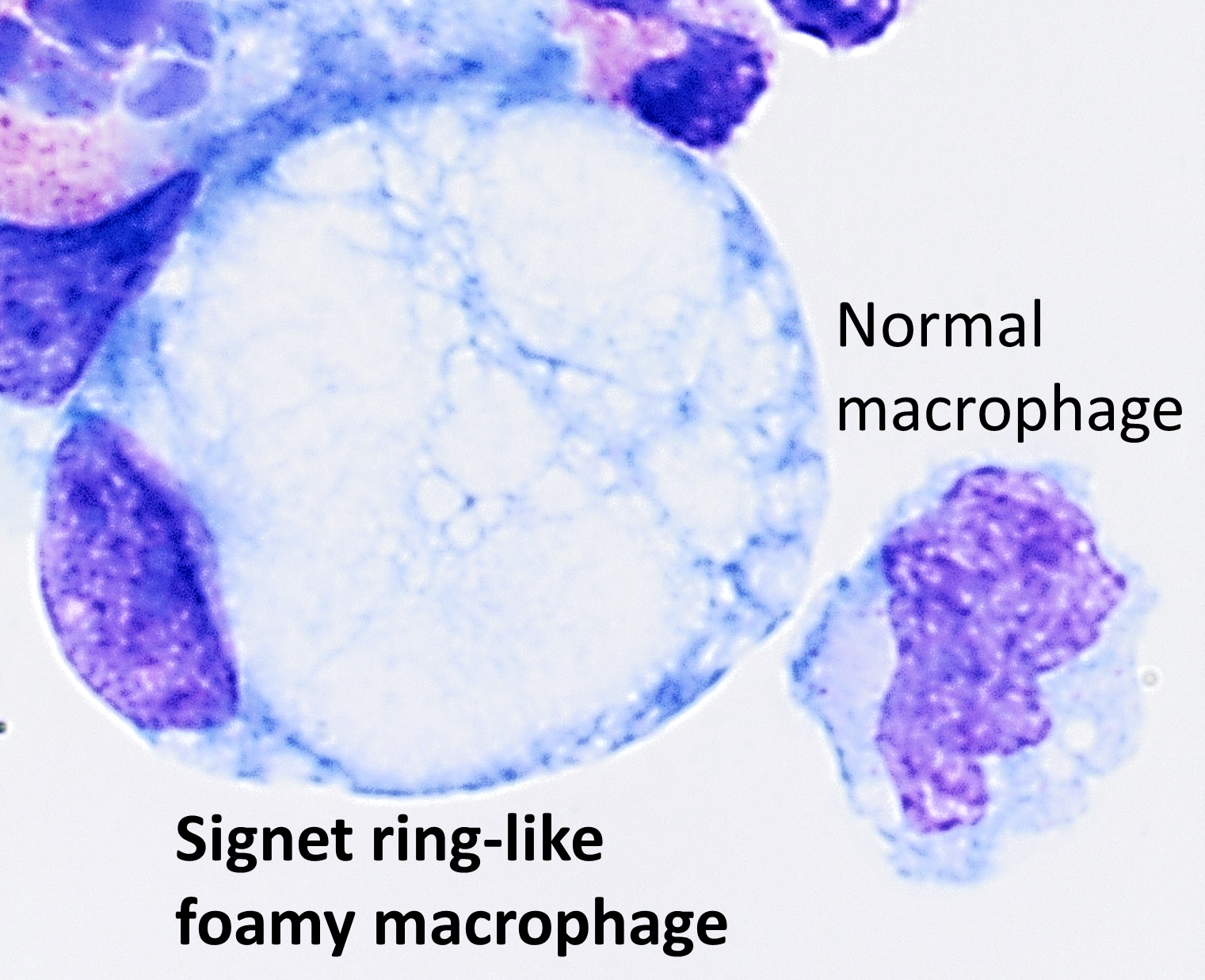
A signet ring-like foamy macrophage, which may mimic a cancer cell, but the texture of the nucleus is similar to that of a normal macrophage.

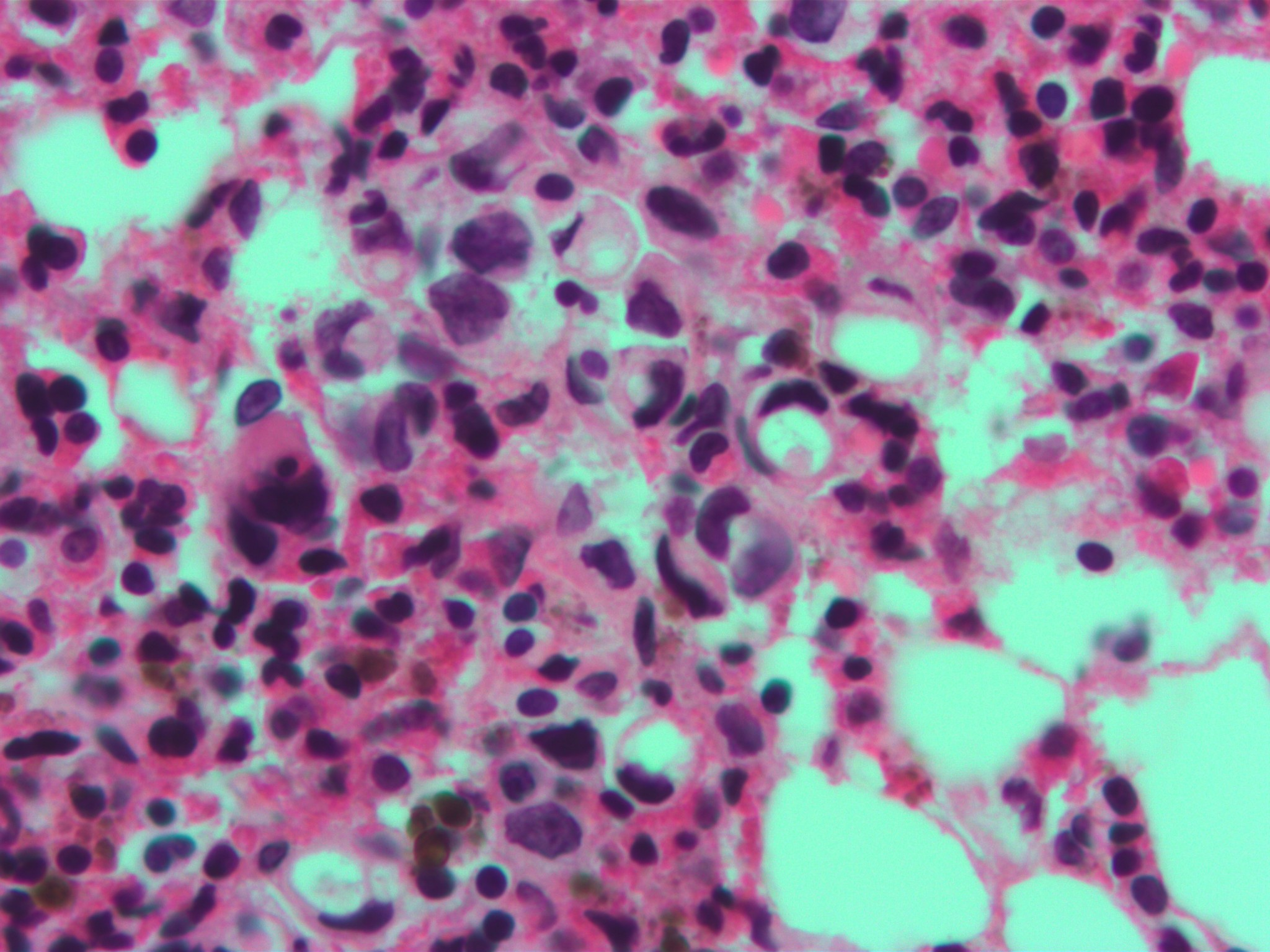
High magnification micrograph showing signet ring cells, with clear cytoplasm, in metastatic breast carcinoma. H&E stain.

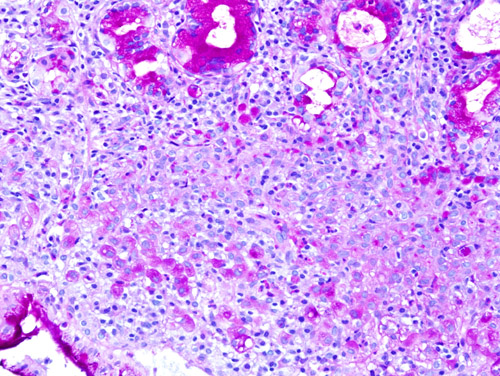
Signet ring cells (magenta) stained with PAS in a gastric signet ring cell carcinoma.

== Diagnostic significance ==
A significant number of signet ring cells, generally, are associated with a worse prognosis.

== Classification of carcinomas ==
SRC carcinomas can be classified using immunohistochemistry.

== See also ==
- Signet ring cell carcinoma
