= Poorly cohesive gastric carcinoma =

Malignant tumor

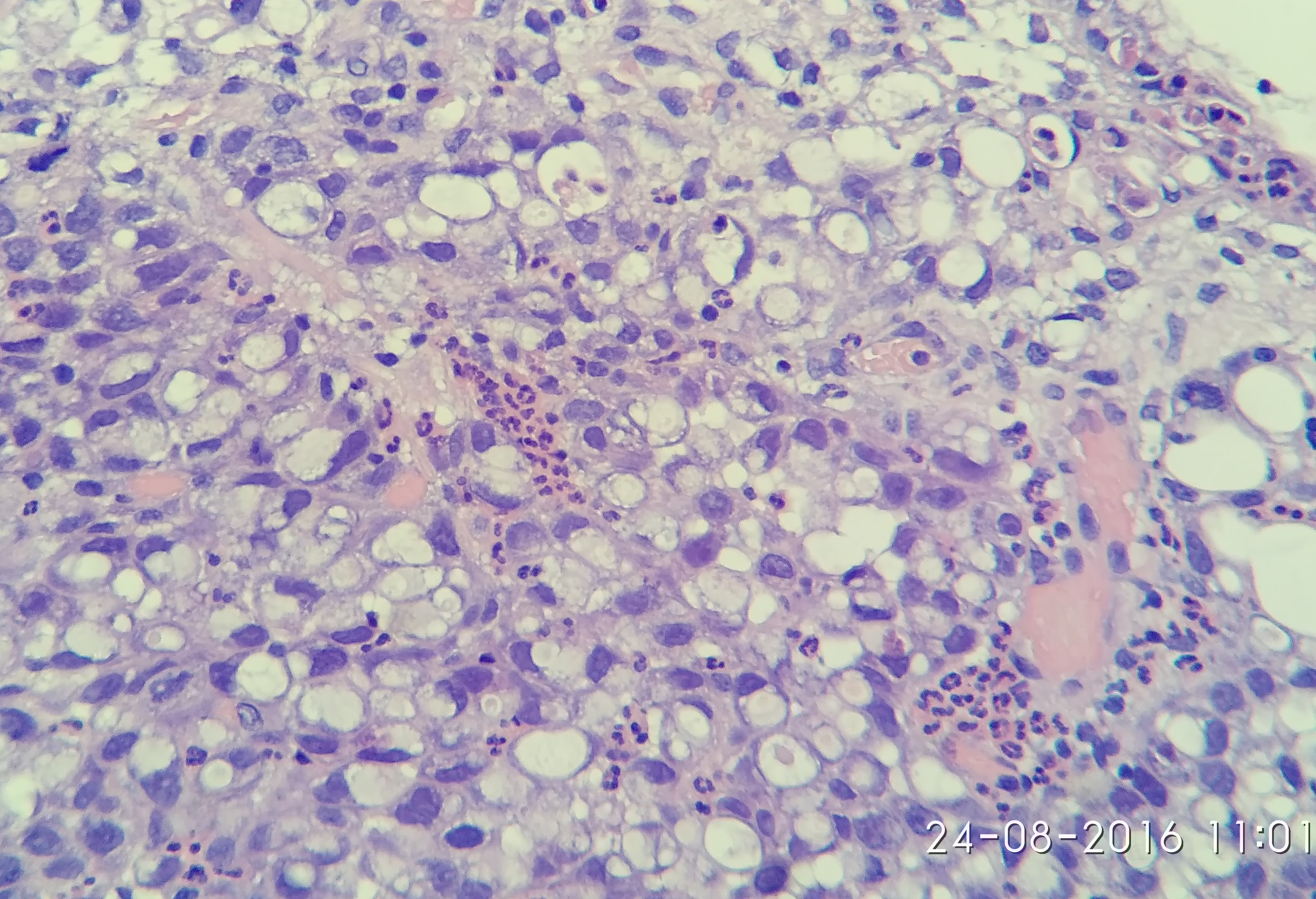
Poorly cohesive gastric carcioma (signet-ring cell type) x400, H&E stain

Poorly cohesive gastric carcinoma (dyscohesive carcinoma, carcinoma with a lack of intercellular connections) is a malignant tumour of epithelial origin, characterized by diffuse distribution of tumour cells, isolated from each other or in small groups.

According to most recently endorsed classification of tumours, established by the World Health Organization/International Agency for Research on Cancer, this term is most appropriate to describe this kind of neoplasm and has its own ICD-O code: 8490/3 in the mentioned classification system.

In the specialized literature can also be found such synonyms as "diffuse carcinoma", "diffuse infiltrative carcinoma." Signet-ring cell gastric carcinoma, previously regarded as an independent type of tumor, today is a special case of poorly cohesive carcinoma.

Tumor cells can be signet-ring type, that have a rounded shape with eccentrically located nucleus, resulting in large amounts of intracellular mucin. They may resemble lymphocytes, histiocytes, and plasma cells. Distribution of cells usually diffuse, they can form small groups of bands of gland-like structures with a conspicuous desmoplastic reaction of stroma. Can be combined with tubular or micropapillary types of tumor tissue.

Pathohistological report of "poorly cohesive carcinoma" is appropriate in case when there is a prevalence of tumor cells with corresponding characteristics.

This type of tumor is more common in young adults, in contrast to tubular and micropapillary carcinomas. In the etiology of the latter great role play environment, presence of Helicobacter pylori infection, the presence and degree of atrophy and intestinalisation.

The etiology of poorly cohesive carcinoma according to the vast majority of researchers is genetically determined, related to deficiency of E-cadherin synthesis.

Grade of poorly cohesive carcinoma is not evaluated by pathologists.
