= Castration cell =

A castration cell is a basophilic cell with a large vacuole found in the anterior pituitary after castration, effective (drug) castration, or long-term use of alcohol.
