= Signet ring cell carcinoma =

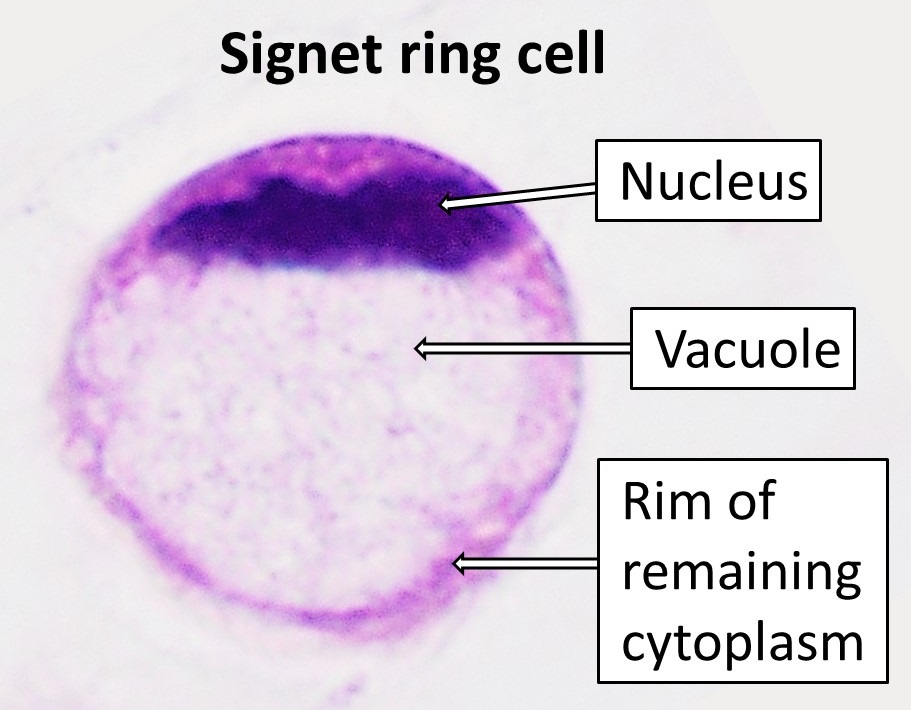
- A signet ring cell, as seen in a case of colon adenocarcinoma with mucinous features, showing a tumor cell with a vacuole of mucin. H&E stain.
- Specialty: Oncology

Signet ring cell carcinoma (SRCC) is a rare form of highly malignant adenocarcinoma that produces mucin. It is an epithelial malignancy characterized by the histologic appearance of signet ring cells.

Primary SRCC tumors are most often found in the glandular cells of the stomach (SRCC originates in the stomach in 56 percent of patients), and less frequently in the breast, gallbladder, urinary bladder, and pancreas. SRCCs do not normally form in the lungs, though a few instances have been reported.

Among colorectal cancers, the prevalence of SRCC is less than one percent. Though incidence and mortality of gastric cancer has declined in many countries over the past 50 years, there has been an increase in occurrences of gastric SRCC-type cancers.

SRCC tumors grow in characteristic sheets, which makes diagnosis using standard imaging techniques, like CT and PET scans, less effective.

== Causes ==
Some cases are inherited, and these cases are often caused by mutations in the CDH1 gene, which encodes the important cell–cell adhesion glycoprotein E-cadherin. Somatic mutations of the APC gene have also been implicated in the development of gastric SRCCs.

The role of other risk factors in gastric cancer such as salt-preserved food, smoking, auto-immune gastritis are not well studied in SRCC.

== Mechanism of formation ==
SRCCs are dedifferentiated adenocarcinomas that lose the capability for cell–cell interaction.

Highly differentiated adenocarcinomas form SRCCs via a loss of adherens and tight junctions that typically separate MUC4, a mucin protein, and ErbB2, an oncogenic receptor. When MUC4 and ErbB2 are able to interact, they trigger an activation loop. As a result, the ErbB2/ErbB3 signaling pathway becomes constitutively activated, cell–cell interactions are lost and signet carcinomas are formed. Constitutive action of the ErbB2/ErbB3 complex also enhances cell growth.

The mechanism of this malignant cancer is still unclear; however, it has been found that a colon carcinoma cell known as HCC2998 causes an increase in differentiated tumor production. The reason for this increase is due to active PI3K that are converted to a SRCC-like cells.

== Metastasis ==
The pattern of metastasis is different for gastric signet cell carcinoma than for intestinal-type gastric carcinoma. The SRCC tumor is often seen in the peritoneum and has also been known to spread to lymphatic permeation of the lungs and to the ovaries, creating Krukenberg tumors. Cases of gastric carcinomas metastasizing to the breast and forming signet-ring cells have also been reported. One study suggests that when signet-ring cells are found in a breast tumor, the presence of gastric cancer should also be considered.

== Histology ==
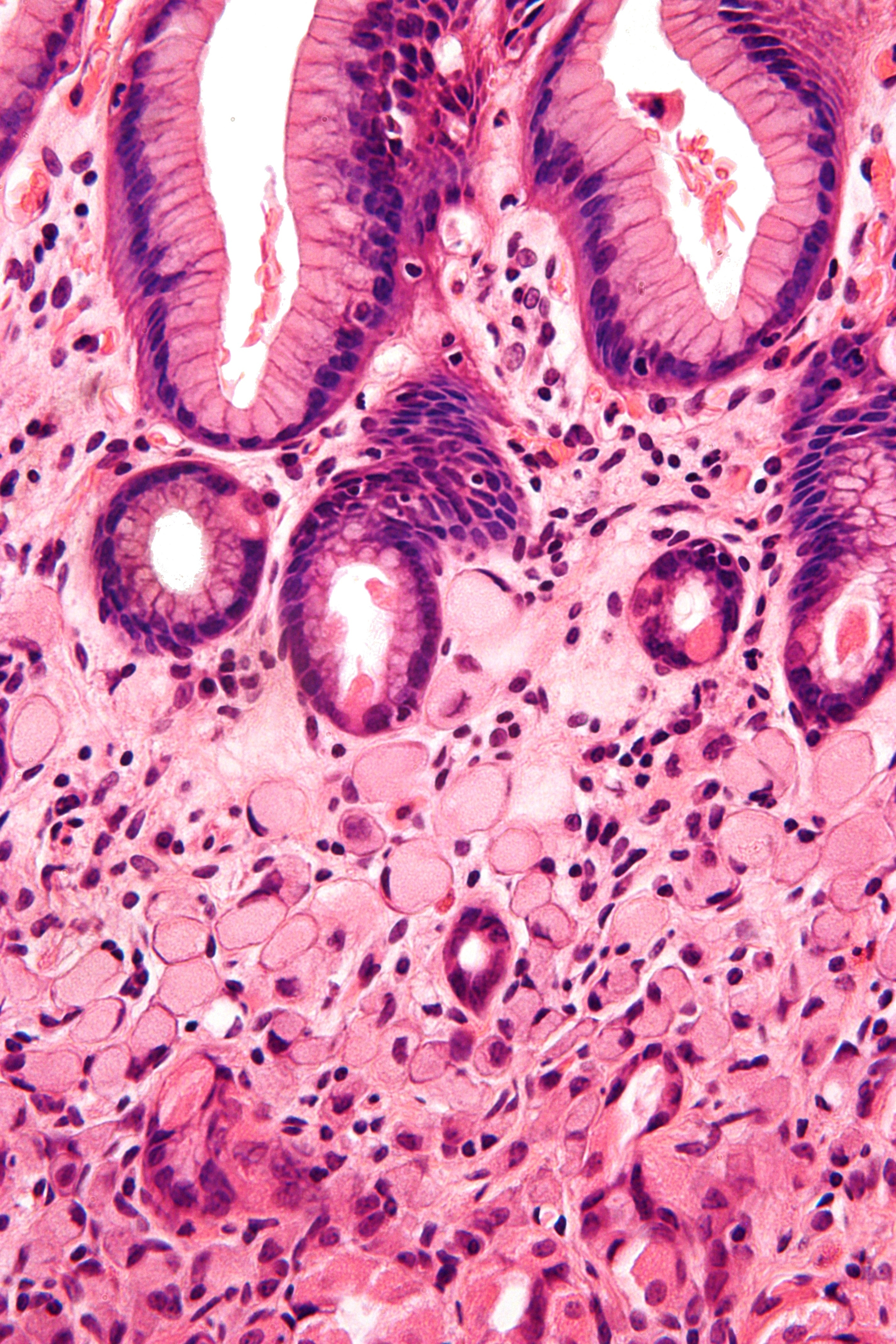
A signet ring cell carcinoma of the stomach. Signet ring cells are seen in the lower half of the image. Gastric epithelium is seen in the upper half of the image. H&E stain.

SRCCs are named due to their resemblance to signet rings, which result from the formation of large vacuoles full of mucin that displaces the nucleus to the cell's periphery.

Stomach cancers with both adenocarcinoma and some SRC (known as mixed-SRCC) exhibit more aggressive behavior than purely SRCC or non-SRCC histologies.

A study of SRCC colorectal cancers compared mucin-rich SRCC tumors and mucin-poor SRCC tumors. They concluded that the latter more frequently demonstrated adverse histologic features such as lymphatic invasion, venous invasion and perineural invasion.

== Treatment ==
Chemotherapy has relatively poor curative efficacy in SRCC patients and overall survival rates are lower compared to patients with more typical cancer pathology. SRCC cancers are usually diagnosed during the late stages of the disease, so the tumors generally spread more aggressively than non-signet cancers, making treatment challenging. In the future, case studies indicate that bone marrow metastases will likely play a larger role in the diagnosis and management of signet ring cell gastric cancer.

In SRCC of the stomach, removal of the stomach cancer is the treatment of choice. There is no combination of chemotherapy which is clearly superior to others, but most active regimens include 5-Fluorouracil (5-FU), Cisplatin, and/or Etoposide. Some newer agents, including Taxol and Gemcitabine are under investigation.

In a single case study of a patient with SRCC of the bladder with recurrent metastases, the patient exhibited a treatment response to palliative FOLFOX-6 chemotherapy.

There are reports of occasional pulmonary tumour thrombotic microangiopathy leading to pulmonary hypertension and coagulation problems that could be successfully treated with Imatinib.

== Prognosis by organ ==
These aggressive tumors are generally diagnosed at advanced stages and survival is generally shorter. The prognosis of SRCC and its chemosensitivity with specific regimens are still controversial as SRCC is not specifically identified in most studies and its poor prognosis may be due to its more advanced stage. One study suggests that its dismal prognosis seems to be caused by its intrinsic tumor biology, suggesting an area for further research.

=== Bladder ===
Primary signet-ring cell carcinoma of the urinary bladder is extremely rare and patient survival is very poor and occurs mainly in men ages 38 to 83. However, one such patient treated with a radical cystectomy followed by combined S-1 and Cisplatin adjuvant chemotherapy did demonstrate promising long-term survival of 90 months.

=== Colorectal ===
Primary signet ring cell carcinoma of the colon and rectum (PSRCCR) is rare, with a reported incidence of less than 1 percent. It has a poor prognosis because symptoms often develop late and it is usually diagnosed at an advanced stage. Five-year survival rates in previous studies ranged from nine to 30 percent. Average survival was between 20 and 45 months. It tends to affect younger adults with higher likelihood of lymphovascular invasion. It is worth noting that the overall survival rate of patients with SRCC was significantly poorer than that of patients with mucinous or poorly differentiated adenocarcinoma.

In advanced gastric cancers, the prognosis for patients with the SRCCs was significantly worse than for the other histological types, which can be explained by the finding that advanced SRCC gastric cancers have a larger tumor size, more lymph node metastasis, a deeper invasive depth and more Borrmann type 4 lesions than other types.

=== Stomach ===
When compared to adenocarcinoma stomach, SRCC in the stomach occurs more often in women and younger patients. Patients with SRCC of the stomach show similar clinicopathological features to patients with undifferentiated histology. A recent study found that patients with SRCC had a better prognosis than patients with undifferentiated gastric carcinoma. However, when narrowed to patients with only advanced stage gastric cancer, those with SRCC had a worse prognosis than other cell types.

== Additional images ==
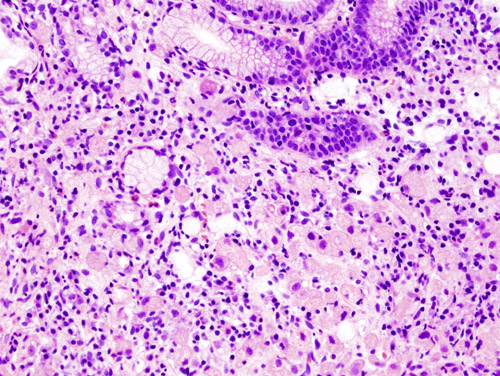
Gastric signet ring cell carcinoma. H&E stain.

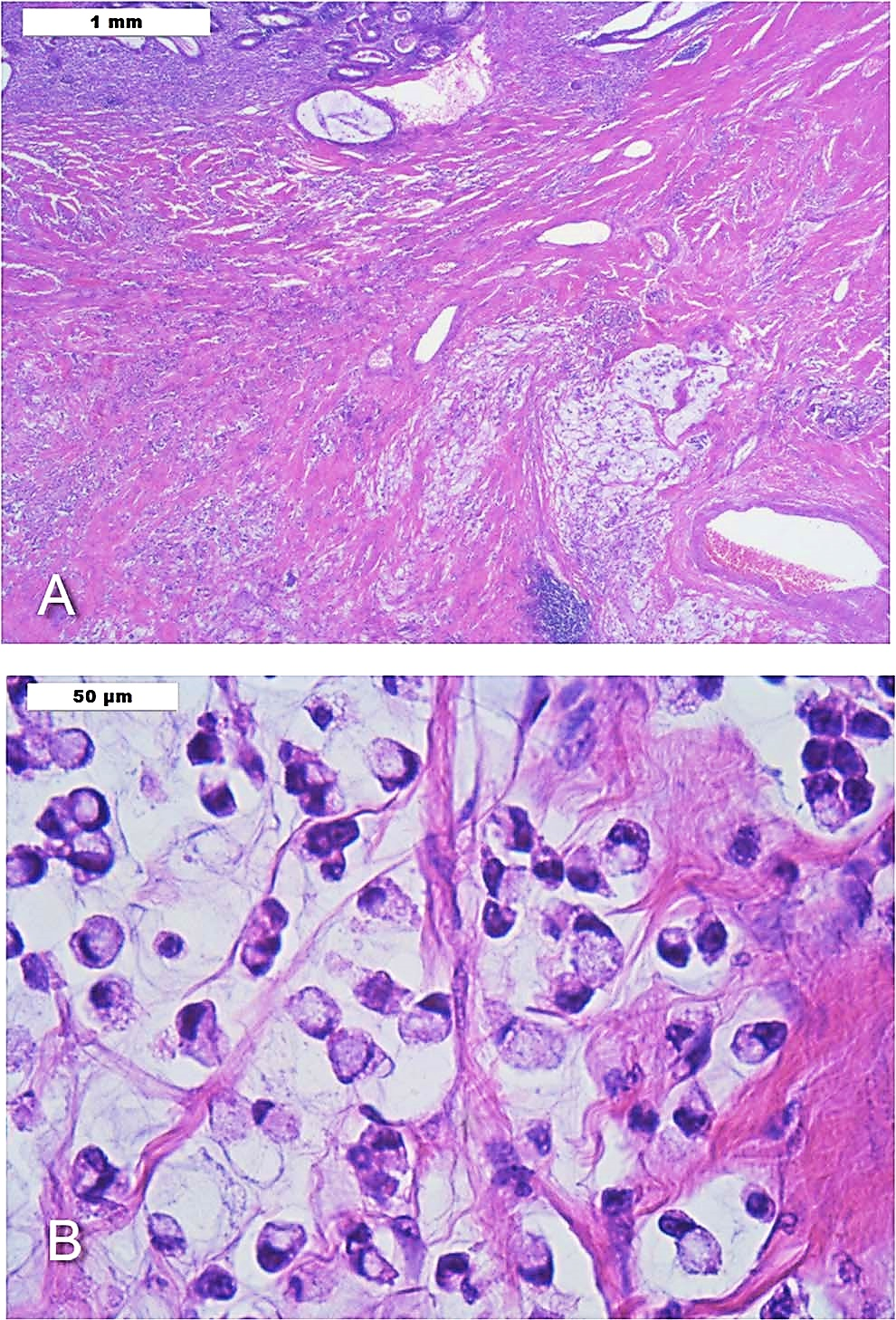
Signet ring cell carcinoma of the ileum. H&E stain
