= Catequentinib =

Clinical data
- Trade names: Focus V
- Other names: Anlotinib; AL3818; AL-3818
- ATC code: None

Identifiers
- IUPAC name: 1-[[4-[(4-Fluoro-2-methyl-1H-indol-5-yl)oxy]-6-methoxyquinolin-7-yl]oxymethyl]cyclopropan-1-amine
- CAS Number: 1058156-90-3
- PubChem CID: 25017411
- IUPHAR/BPS: 9601
- DrugBank: DB11885
- ChemSpider: 45743493
- UNII: GKF8S4C432
- KEGG: D12526
- ChEMBL: ChEMBL4303201

Chemical and physical data
- Formula: C_{23}H_{22}FN_{3}O_{3}
- Molar mass: 407.445 g·mol^{−1}
- 3D model (JSmol): Interactive image
- SMILES: CC1=CC2=C(N1)C=CC(=C2F)OC3=C4C=C(C(=CC4=NC=C3)OCC5(CC5)N)OC
- InChI: InChI=InChI=1S/C23H22FN3O3/c1-13-9-15-16(27-13)3-4-19(22(15)24)30-18-5-8-26-17-11-21(20(28-2)10-14(17)18)29-12-23(25)6-7-23/h3-5,8-11,27H,6-7,12,25H2,1-2H3; Key:KSMZEXLVHXZPEF-UHFFFAOYSA-N

Catequentinib (INN; formerly anlotinib) is a pharmaceutical drug for the treatment of cancer. It is approved in China for the treatment of locally advanced or metastatic non-small cell lung cancer (NSCLC) in patients who have undergone progression or recurrence after at least two lines of systemic chemotherapy. It is also approved in China as a second‑line treatment for advanced soft-tissue sarcoma.

Catequentinib is a tyrosine kinase inhibitor that targets several different proteins including vascular endothelial growth factor receptor (VEGFR), fibroblast growth factor receptor (FGFR), platelet-derived growth factor receptors (PDGFR), and c-kit.

Adverse effects include hypertension, fatigue, thyroid-stimulating hormone elevation, and hand-foot syndrome, among others.

== Synthesis ==
The synthesis of Catequentinib was recently reported:

The reaction between 7-(Benzyloxy)-4-chloro-6-methoxyquinoline [286371-49-1] (1) & 4-Fluoro-5-hydroxy-2-methylindole [288385-88-6] (2) gives an intermediate [1210828-43-5]. Catalytic reduction resulted in debenzylation occurring to give [1210828-44-6] (3). Treatment of Cbz-1-Aminocyclopropylmethanol [103500-22-7] (4) with mesyl chloride gave [1058137-81-7] (5). Displacement of the leaving group by the unmasked aromatic alcohol resulted in ether formation, PC59805929 (6). The protecting group was then removed by catalytic reduction. Treatment with hydrogen chloride then completed the synthesis of the target molecule (7).
