= Synaptic stabilization =

Modifying synaptic strength via cell adhesion molecules

Synaptic stabilization by cell adhesion molecules

Synaptic stabilization is crucial in the developing and adult nervous systems and is considered a result of the late phase of long-term potentiation (LTP). The mechanism involves strengthening and maintaining active synapses through increased expression of cytoskeletal and extracellular matrix elements and postsynaptic scaffold proteins, while pruning less active ones. For example, cell adhesion molecules (CAMs) play a large role in synaptic maintenance and stabilization. Gerald Edelman discovered CAMs and studied their function during development, which showed CAMs are required for cell migration and the formation of the entire nervous system. In the adult nervous system, CAMs play an integral role in synaptic plasticity relating to learning and memory.

== Types of CAMs ==
=== SynCAMs ===
Synaptic cell adhesion molecules (CAMs) play a crucial role in axon pathfinding and synaptic establishment between neurons during neurodevelopment and are integral members in many synaptic processes including the correct alignment of pre- and post-synaptic signal transduction pathways, vesicular recycling in regards to endocytosis and exocytosis, integration of postsynaptic receptors and anchoring to the cytoskeleton to ensure stability of synaptic components.

SynCAM's (also known as Cadm or nectin-like molecules) are a specific type of synaptic CAM found in vertebrates that promotes growth and stabilization of excitatory (not inhibitory) synapses. SynCAM's are localized primarily in the brain at both pre- and postsynaptic sites and their structures consist of intracellular FERM and PDZ binding domains, a single transmembrane domain, and three extracellular Ig-domains. During neurodevelopment, SynCAMs such as SynCAM1 act as "contact sensors" of axonal growth cones accumulating rapidly when axo-dendritic connections are made and helping to form a stable adhesion complex.

synCAM1 along with neuroligin are the two CAM's known to be sufficient to initiate the formation of presynaptic terminals, as addition of synCAM1 to media of co-cultured neuronal and non-neuronal cells lead to the establishment of presynaptic terminals. Homophillic binding of two synCAM1 molecules on the filopodia of axonal growth cone and dendritic spine allow for initial contact between pre- and postsynaptic cell to be made.

synCAMs belong to the Ig superfamily of proteins. The cytosolic PDZ domains of synCAMs imbedded in the post-synaptic membrane interact with post-synaptic scaffold protein PSD-95 which helps anchor the complex to the underlying cytoskeleton.

=== Cadherin-catenin ===
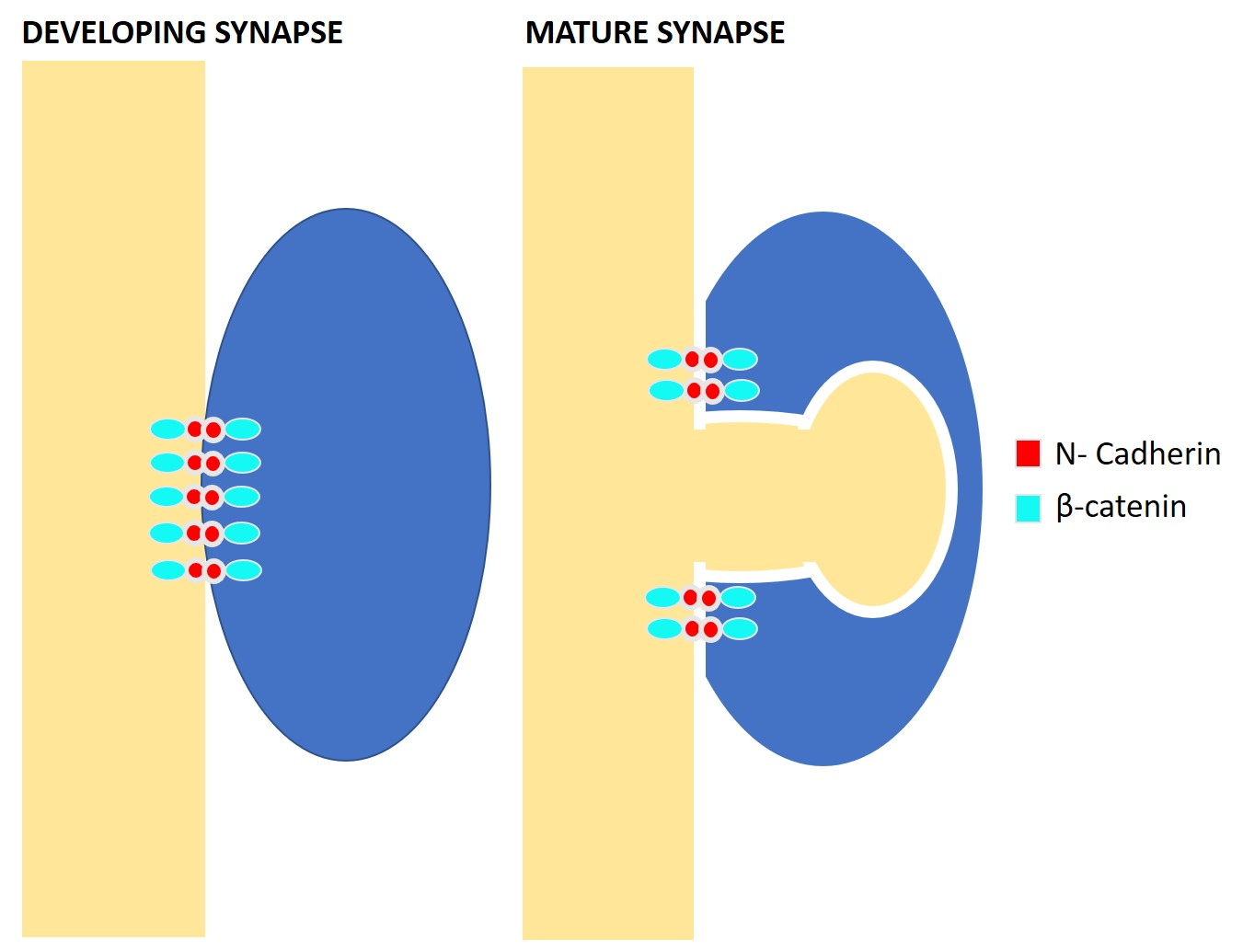
Temporal and spatial distribution of N-cadherin complexes in the developing and mature synapse

Cadherins are calcium- dependent, homophilic cell adhesion molecules that form complexes with cytosolic partners known as catenins. Components of this complex bind to a number of different scaffolding proteins, phosphatases, kinases, and receptors. Classical cadherins have five extracellular repeating structures which bind calcium, a single transmembrane domain, and an intracellular tail with a distal cytosolic domain that binds a catenin partner. Recent work has implicated the cadherin-catenin complex in a number of different central nervous system processes such as synaptic stabilization and plasticity.

Many cadherins in the central nervous system exhibit distinct spatial and temporal expression patterns. For example, N-cadherin is widely expressed at the developing synapse and later remains near the mature active zone implicating that this complex may be well-suited to provide a link between structural changes and synaptic stability. In fact, local synaptic activity changes impact the expression of the cadherin-catenin complexes. An increase in activity at a particular spine leads to the dimerization of N-cadherin which is then cleaved leading the repression of CBP/CREB transcription. This repression has many developmental and plasticity related implications.

In the case of dendritic spine formation and pruning, a competition hypothesis has been proposed and corroborated. This hypothesis suggests that relative levels of cadherin-catenin complexes, which are distributed amongst spines in a local area in an activity-dependent manner, determines the fate of individual spines. That is, the inter-spine competition for β-catenin determines whether a spine will be matured (increased number of complexes) or pruned (decreased number of complexes). This is a critical mechanism during the refinement of cortical circuitry that occurs throughout development.

=== Nectin ===
Nectins are a distinct family of cell adhesion molecules. These CAMs are involved in the initial contact of presynaptic and postsynaptic neuronal processes during synapse formation. There are only four well characterized nectins at the synapse, they are Nectin-1, 2, 3, and 4. All membrane-bound nectins possess an extracellular region with three immunoglobulin-like loops. The furthest loop from the membrane is called the V-type loop and the two loops more interior are C2-type loops. Multiple nectins on one cell membrane will bind together at the V-type loop to form a cluster of nectin proteins, a process called cis-clustering. When two cells possessing individual cis-clusters come into contact they form a strong complex called a trans-interaction which provides adhesion and, in some cases, signaling between the two cells.

The most robust knowledge of nectin's role in synaptic stabilization comes from the synapses made between mossy fiber terminals and pyramidal cell dendrites in the CA3 region of the hippocampus. The nectins involved in formation and stabilization of this synapse are Nectin-1 and Nectin-3 which protrude from the plasma membrane of the postsynaptic cell and presynaptic cell, respectively, forming heterophilic extracellular contacts. The intracellular domain of all nectins directly bind to a protein called L-Afadin. L-Afadin is an actin binding protein that binds to the F-actin of the actin cytoskeleton. In this way, nectins form ridged connections of the cells actin architecture allowing for the synapse to develop in a controlled and stable environment.

As synapses mature in the CA3 region, nectins and cadherins, which affiliate closely with one another in synaptic stabilization, are shifted to the periphery of the active zone and form the puncta adherens junction (PAJ). The PAJ functions much like the adherens junctions in epithelial tissues. The displacement of these CAMs and the formation of this junction provides the nascent synaptic membranes room to interact and mature while partitioning off the surrounding membrane and providing cytoskeletal fixation.

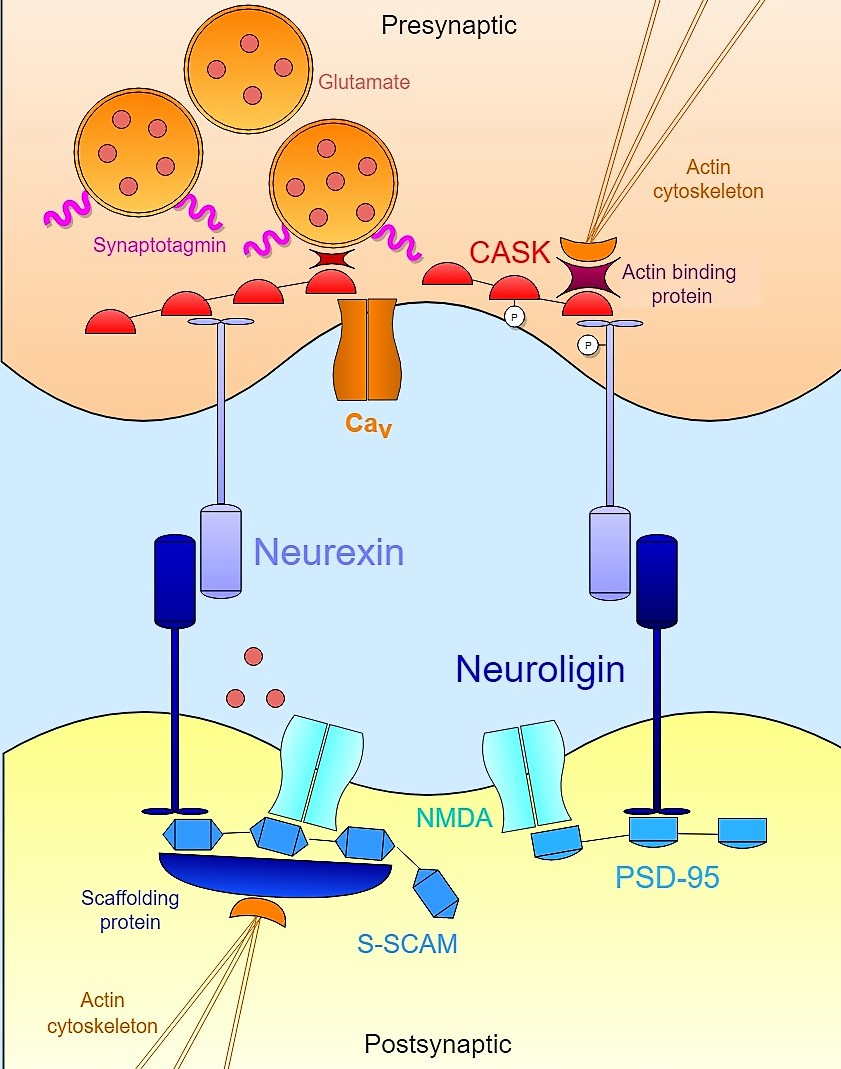
Neurexin-neuroligin interactions promote synapse stabilization. On the presynaptic side, neurexin associates with synaptotagmin, calcium channels. On the post-synaptic side, neuroligin PDZ domain interacts with scaffolding proteins that help cluster receptor channels.

=== Neurexin-neuroligin ===
Neurexin-Neuroligin interactions help establish the trans-synaptic functional asymmetry essential for the stabilization and maintenance of proper synaptic transmission. Presynaptic neurexin and its postsynaptic binding partner, neuroligin, complex early in neural development and are both known to be potent inducers of synaptogenesis. Non-neuronal cells that artificially express neurexin are sufficient to mobilize post-synaptic specializations in co-cultured neurons; neuroligin-expressing cells are likewise able to induce markers of pre-synaptic differentiation in neighboring neurons. However, while both play an important role in synaptogenesis, these cell adhesion molecules are not necessary for formation of neuronal connections during development. A triple knockout mouse mutant of either neurexins or neuroligins exhibit a normal number of synapses but express an embryonic lethal phenotype due to impairment of normal synaptic transmission. Therefore, they are not necessary for synapse formation per se but are essential for the maturation and integration of synapses into the functional circuits necessary for survival.

Beyond their extracellular contact with each other, neurexins and neuroligins also bind intracellularly to a vast network of adaptor proteins and scaffolding structures, which in concert with the actin cytoskeleton, help localize necessary components of synaptic transmission. For example, the first neuroligin (NLGN1) discovered was identified by its PDZ domain which binds to PSD95, a well-known a scaffold protein at glutamatergic synapses that functionally links NMDA receptors to the proper post-synaptic locale. Similarly, another isoform of neuroligin (NLGN2) interacts with gephyrin, a scaffolding protein specific to GABA-ergic synapses, and is responsible for activation of the synaptic adaptor protein collybistin. In the case of neurexins, their intracellular binding interactions are equally as important in recruiting the essential machinery for synaptic transmission at the active zone. Like neuroligins, neurexins possess a PDZ-domain that associates with calcium-calmodulin-dependent protein kinase (CASK). In addition to phosphorylating itself and neurexin, CASK promotes interactions between neurexins and actin binding proteins, thus providing a direct link by which neurexin can modulate cytoskeletal dynamics that is essential for synaptic stability and plasticity. Neurexin can also bind synaptotagmin, a protein embedded in the membrane of synaptic vesicles, and can also promote associations with voltage-gated calcium channels which mediate the ion flux required for neurotransmitter exocytosis upon synaptic stimulation. In this way, neurexin and neuroligin coordinate the morphological and functional aspects of the synapse which in turn permits nascent, immature contacts to stabilize into full-fledged functional platforms for neurotransmission.

=== Ephrin-Eph signaling ===
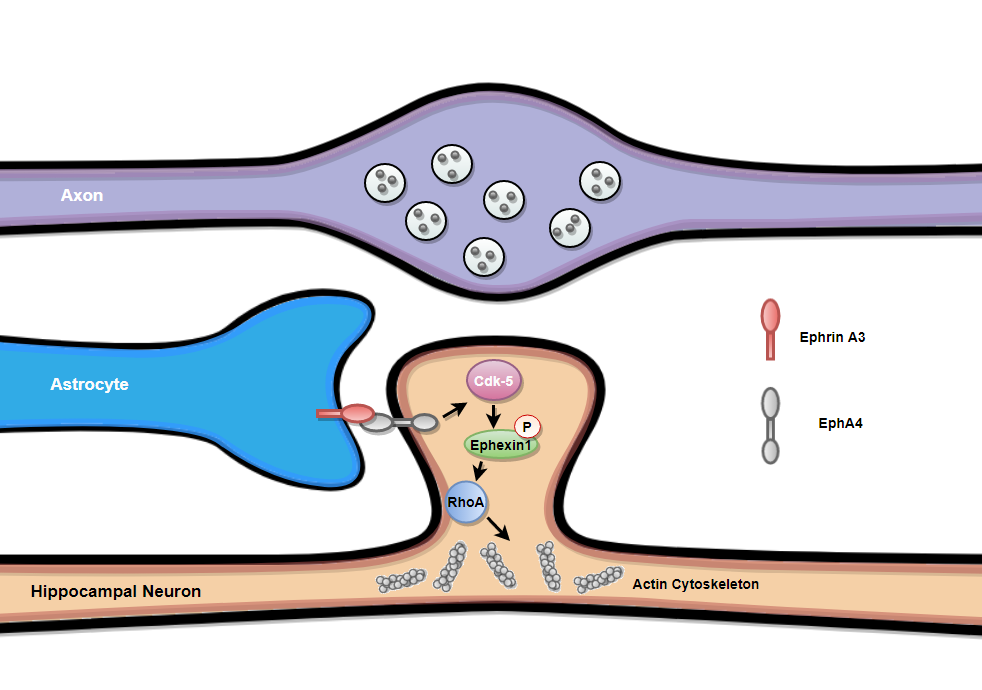
Ephrin A3/EphA4 signaling initiates a cascade of events that results in that regulation of the actin cytoskeleton.

Non-traditional adhesion molecules, such as the ephrins, also help stabilize synaptic contacts. Eph receptors and their membrane bound ligands, the ephrins, are involved in a variety of cellular processes during development and maturation including axon guidance, neuronal migration, synaptogenesis, and axon pruning. In the hippocampus, dendritic spine morphology may be regulated by astrocytes via bi-directional ephrin/EphA signaling. Astrocytes and their processes express ephrin A3, whereas the EphA4 receptor is enriched in hippocampal neurons. This interaction, mediated by ephrin A3/EphA4 signaling, induces the recruitment and activation of cyclin-dependent kinase 5 (Cdk5), which then phosphorylates the guanine exchange factor (GEF), ephexin1. Phosphorylated ephexin1 can then activate the small GTPase, RhoA, leading to subsequent activation of its effector, Rho-kinase (ROCK), which results in the rearrangement of actin filaments. Through this mechanism, astrocytic processes are able to stabilize individual dendritic protrusions as well as their maturation into spines via ephrin/EphA signaling. Forward signaling involving the activation of EphA4 results in the stabilization of synaptic proteins at the neuromuscular junction. As in the EphA4/ephrinA3-mediated neuron–glia interaction, this process regulates dynamics of the actin cytoskeleton by activating ROCK through ephexin.

Ephrin B/EphB signaling is also involved in synaptic stabilization through different mechanisms. These molecules contain cytoplasmic tails which interact with scaffolding proteins via their PDZ domains to stabilize newly formed CNS synapses. For example, Ephrin B3 interacts with the adaptor protein glutamate-receptor-interacting protein 1 (GRIP-1) to regulate the development of excitatory dendritic shaft synapses. This process, which was identified in cultures of hippocampal neurons, revealed that Eph/ephrin B3 reverse signaling recruits GRIP1 to the membrane of the postsynaptic shaft. Once at the membrane shaft, GRIP1 helps anchor glutamate receptors below the presynaptic terminal. This process also involves the phosphorylation of a serine residue near the ephrin-B carboxyl terminus (proximal to the PDZ-binding motif) that leads to the stabilization of AMPA receptors at synapses.

Another mechanism, found in hippocampal neurons, revealed that EphB signaling could promote spine maturation by modulating Rho GTPase activity, as observed with EphAs. Unlike EphAs, however, the EphB2 receptor has been shown to interact with the postsynaptic N-methyl-D-aspartate receptors (NMDARs) to recruit the GEF Tiam1 to the complex upon ephrinB binding. Phosphorylation of Tiam1 occurs in response to NMDAR activity, which allows for the influx of calcium that activates Tiam1. This mechanism also results in the modulation of the actin cytoskeleton. As a result of this stabilization, both EphB2 forward signaling and ephrin-B3 reverse signaling has been found to induce LTP via NMDARs.
