= LRRC40 =

Protein-coding gene in humans

Identifiers
- Aliases: LRRC40, dJ677H15.1, leucine rich repeat containing 40
- External IDs: MGI: 1914394; GeneCards: LRRC40

Gene location (Human)
Chr.	Chromosome 1 (human)
Band	1p31.1	Start	70,144,805 bp
Band	1p31.1	End	70,205,579 bp

Gene location (Mouse)
Chr.	Chromosome 3 (mouse)
Band	3|3 H4	Start	157,742,299 bp
Band	3|3 H4	End	157,774,124 bp
RNA expression pattern
Bgee	Human / Mouse (ortholog); Top expressed in: jejunal mucosa; oocyte; secondary oocyte; endothelial cell; Brodmann area 23; embryo; oral cavity; synovial joint; cerebellar vermis; skin of hip / Top expressed in: ureter; medullary collecting duct; primary oocyte; secondary oocyte; zygote; cumulus cell; renal corpuscle; primitive streak; endocardial cushion; maxillary prominence; More reference expression data
BioGPS	n/a
Orthologs
Databases	NCBI: entry; OMA: entry
Species	Human	Mouse
Entrez	55631	67144
Ensembl	ENSG00000066557	ENSMUSG00000063052
UniProt	Q9H9A6	Q9CRC8
RefSeq (mRNA)	NM_017768	NM_001289524; NM_001289525; NM_024194; NM_001359763
RefSeq (protein)	NP_060238	NP_001276453; NP_001276454; NP_077156; NP_001346692
Location (UCSC)	Chr 1: 70.14 – 70.21 Mb	Chr 3: 157.74 – 157.77 Mb
PubMed search
- Wikidata
View/Edit Human	View/Edit Mouse

Leucine rich repeat containing 40 (LRRC40) is a protein that in humans is encoded by the LRRC40 gene.

== Species distribution ==
LRRC40 is conserved throughout all of its orthologs. The entire protein is highly conserved in mammals, while conservation is high within the leucine rich repeats in the rest of the orthologs. Orthologs were found all the way back to the scarlet sea anemone and homologs were found in bacteria and Archaea using BLAST. The following table gives information on the homologs of LRRC40.

Genus species	Organism common name	Divergence from humans (MYA)	NCBI mRNA accession	Sequence similarity	Protein length	Common gene name
Homo sapiens	Humans	--	NM_017768	100%	602	LRRC40
Pan troglodytes	Common chimp	6.4	XM_513483	99%	602	Hypothetical protein
Pongo abelii	Orangutan	15.8	NM_001131180	99%	602	LRRC40
Macaca fascicularis	Long-tailed macaque	30.2	AB179219	99%	602	Full LRRC40
Callithrix jacchus	Common marmoset	43.9	XM_002750952.1	99%	602	Predicted: LRRC40
Sus scrofa	Wild boar	92.5	XM_003127928	96%	602	Predicted: LRRC40 like protein
Mus musculus	Mouse	94.1	NM_024194	92%	602	LRRC40
Monodelphis domestica	Opossum	160.2	XM_001379417	86%	598	Hypothetical protein
Gallus gallus	Chicken	274.8	NM_001031295	85%	603	LRRC40
Taeniopygia guttata	Zebra finch	274.8	XM_002188367	85%	605	Predicted: LRRC40
Xenopus (Silurana) tropicalis	Western clawed frog	389.7	NM_001011310	80%	605	LRRC40
Danio rerio	Zebrafish	444.3	NM_199862	83%	601	LRRC40
Salmo salar	Salmon	444.3	BT043621	82%	600	LRRC40
Nematostella vectensis	Scarlet sea anemone	830.3	XM_001640230	66%	602	Predicted protein
Culex quinquefasciatus	Southern house mosquito	838.3	XM_001842697.1	58%	612	LRRC40

== Gene ==
LRRC40 is located on the negative DNA strand (see Sense (molecular biology)) of chromosome 1 from 70,611,483- 70,671,223. The gene produces a 2958 base pair mRNA. There are 15 predicted exons in the human gene with four other splice patterns predicted on GeneCards by the Alternative Splice Database.

=== Gene neighborhood ===
LRRC40 is neighbored downstream by LRRC7 (70,225,888 - 70,587,570) on the positive DNA strand and upstream by SRSF11 (70,687,320-70,716,488) on the positive DNA strand.

=== Gene expression ===
LRRC40 is expressed between the 50th and 100th percentile in almost every tissue in the body.

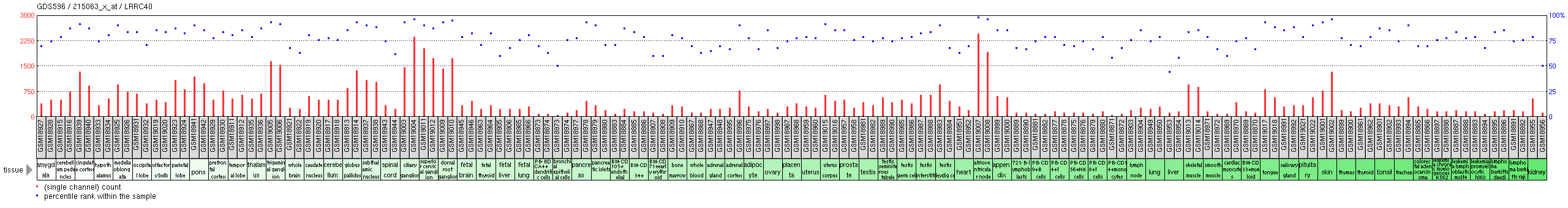
Expression of LRRC40 in 79 human tissues

== Protein ==
While the exact function of the LRRC40 protein is not yet understood, it is believed to participate in protein-protein interactions because it is a member of the leucine rich repeat family of proteins which are known to participate in protein-protein interactions.

=== Properties ===
LRRC40 is a 602 amino acid protein with a molecular weight of 68.254 kDa and an isoelectric point of 6.04. LRRC40 is expected to localize to the nucleus and has no transmembrane domains to anchor it to the nuclear membrane. LRRC40 has many predicted phosphorylation sites. Of the 19 predicted phosphoserine sites, only two are conserved within the orthologs. These two sites are S38 and S391.

=== Protein structure ===
The secondary structure of the protein has a pattern within the leucine repeat regions. Each leucine repeat has a β-sheet and α-helix. The image to the right shows the particular horseshoe-like structure of a protein with many leucine rich repeats. Depending on the area where the LRRs are located, other proteins can bind within the curve of the horseshoe or attach to the outside of the protein.

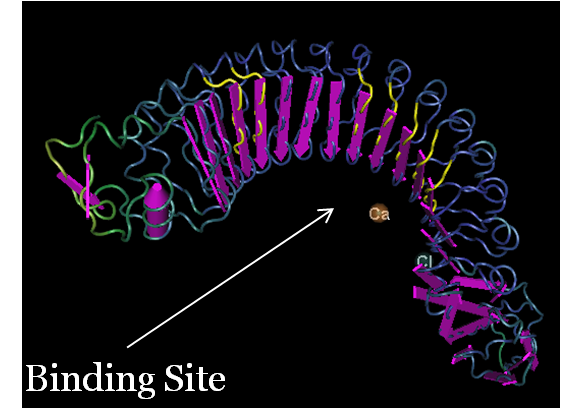
Structure of the Inla S192n G194S protein without its binding partner, sHEC1. The binding site was left empty to show the highlights of the leucine rich repeats (in yellow) demonstrating the protein-binding properties of LRRs.

== Protein interactions ==
According to Genecards, LRRC40 has 756 possible protein interactions. These interactions are based on results in the Molecular Interaction database which provided two possible protein interactions. The two proteins are described in the table below.

Abbreviation	Protein name	NCBI protein accession	Cellular location	Function
CDC5L	Cell division cycle 5-like protein	NP_001244	nucleus	transcription regulation and mRNA processing
SNW1	Ski-interacting protein	NP_036377.1	nucleus	mRNA processing
