= Leucine rich repeat containing 27 =

Human LRRC27 gene

LRRC27

Identifiers
- Aliases: LRRC27, leucine rich repeat containing 27
- External IDs: MGI: 1923862; GeneCards: LRRC27

Gene location (Human)
Chr.	Chromosome 10 (human)
Band	10q26.3	Start	132,332,154 bp
Band	10q26.3	End	132,381,508 bp

Gene location (Mouse)
Chr.	Chromosome 7 (mouse)
Band	7|7 F4	Start	138,792,904 bp
Band	7|7 F4	End	138,822,895 bp
RNA expression pattern
Bgee	Human / Mouse (ortholog); Top expressed in: sperm; left testis; right testis; right uterine tube; ventricular zone; anterior pituitary; ganglionic eminence; granulocyte; right frontal lobe; cingulate gyrus / Top expressed in: spermatid; testicle; spermatocyte; granulocyte; islet of Langerhans; white adipose tissue; neural layer of retina; zygote; secondary oocyte; epiblast; More reference expression data
BioGPS	n/a
Orthologs
Databases	NCBI: entry; OMA: entry
Species	Human	Mouse
Entrez	80313	76612
Ensembl	ENSG00000148814	ENSMUSG00000015980
UniProt	Q9C0I9	Q80YS5
RefSeq (mRNA)	NM_001143757; NM_001143758; NM_001143759; NM_001309474; NM_030626	NM_001143755; NM_027164
RefSeq (protein)	NP_001137229; NP_001137230; NP_001137231; NP_001296403; NP_085129	NP_001137227; NP_081440
Location (UCSC)	Chr 10: 132.33 – 132.38 Mb	Chr 7: 138.79 – 138.82 Mb
PubMed search
- Wikidata
View/Edit Human	View/Edit Mouse

Leucine rich repeat containing 27 (LRRC27) a is a protein which in humans is encoded by the LRRC27 gene.

== Gene ==
Homo sapiens gene Leucine Rich Repeat containing 27 (LRRC27) is a protein coding gene that is located on chromosome 10 at 10q26.3.... The gene is on the plus (+) strand, and is 8251 base pairs long. The gene has 9 exons

== Transcript ==
LRRC27 has 45 transcript variants. Transcript variant 2 encodes isoform a in humans. The mRNA sequence for this variant is 8251 base pairs in length, and all 9 exons are present.

The LRRC27 transcript has low and variable expression in many tissues, but with notable amounts of the transcript present in the brain, fetal brain, and testis

== Protein ==
LRRC27 Isoform a in humans is 530 amino acids long with a predicted molecular weight of ~60 kDa and predicted isoelectric point around 9. It is relatively poor in tyrosine compared to other proteins. LRRC27 is also largely localized in the nucleus of a cell.

=== Domains and Motifs ===
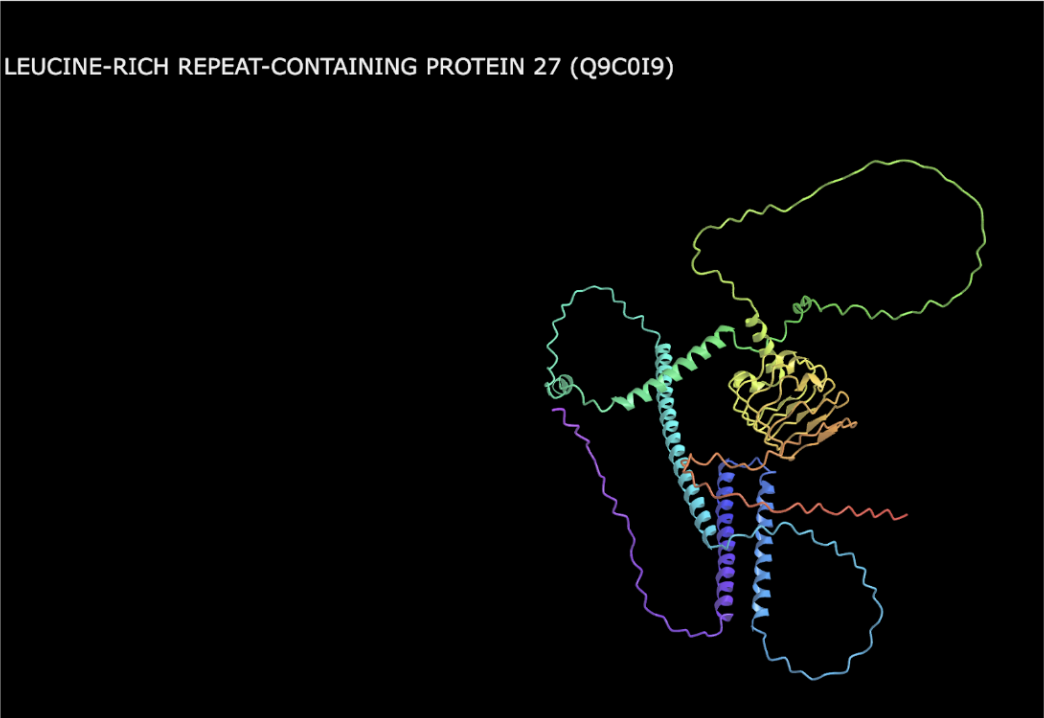
AlphaFold depiction of LRRC27.

The protein has 5 leucine rich regions and 2 disordered regions

=== Structure ===
LRRC27 structure is largely helical, with strands present in the leucine rich regions of the protein

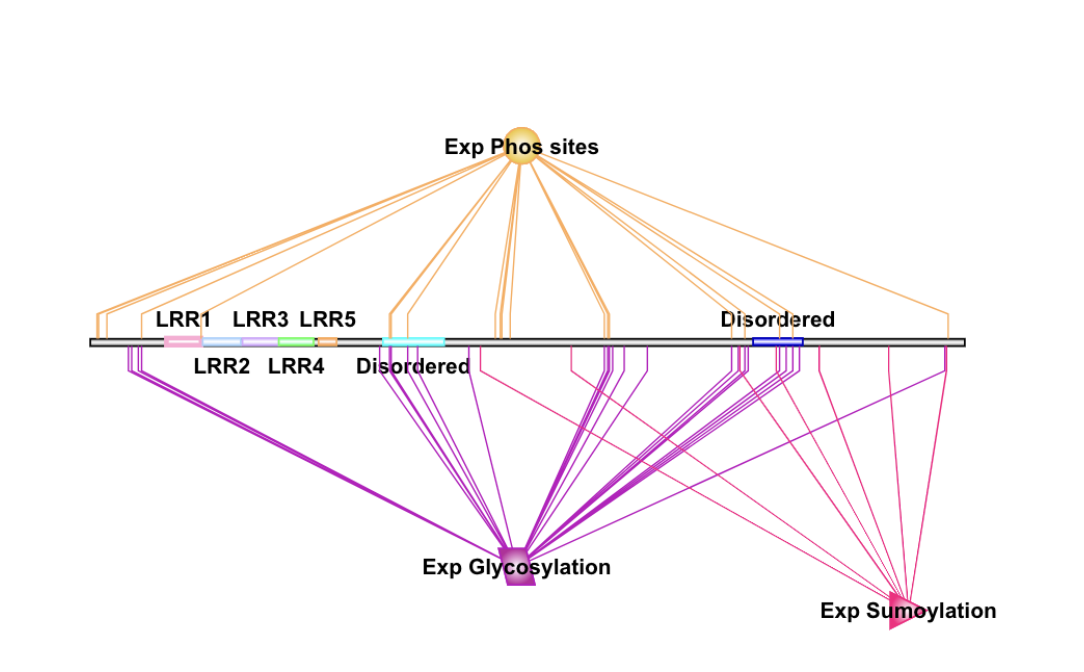
BioCuckoo Illustrator for Biological Sequences annotated linear depiction of LRRC27 with experimental PTM sites.

=== Post-Translational Modifications ===
LRRC27 has several phosphorylation, o-linked glycosylation, and sumoylation sites that may change its structure post-translationally.

== Evolution ==
=== Paralogs ===
Paralogs for LRRC27 include LRRC7 (Leucine Rich Region Containing 7) and LRCH1 (Leucine Rich Repeats and Calponin Homology Domain Containing 1).

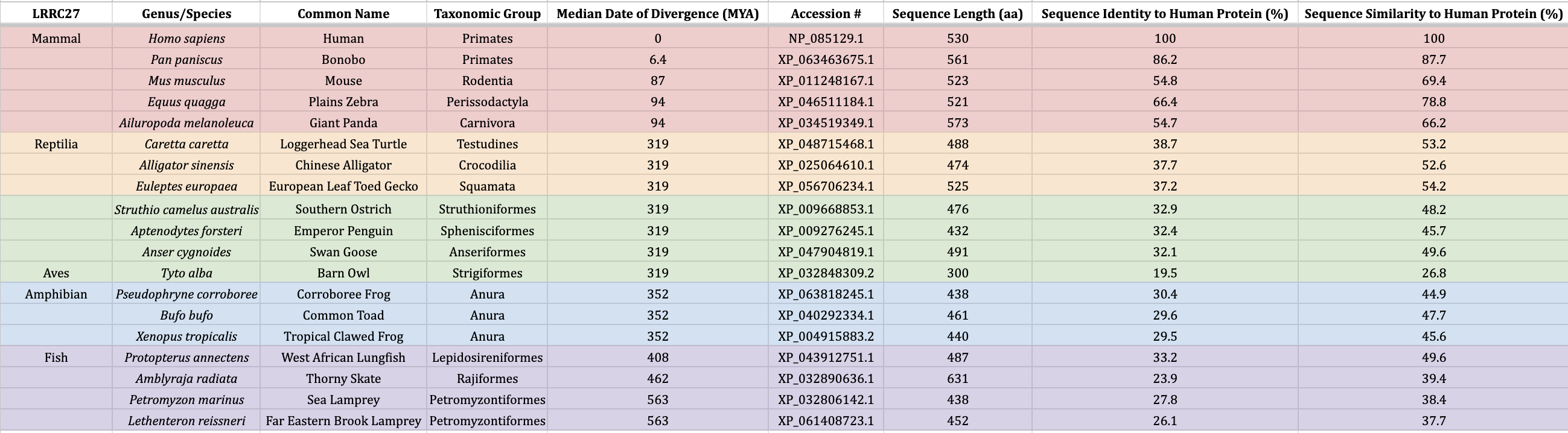
Presence of the LRRC27 gene in classes Mammalia, Reptilia, Aves, Amphibian, and Fish are shown. Median date of Divergence from Homo sapiens, sequence identity, and sequence similarly to the human protein are included.

=== Orthologs ===
LRRC27 is widely conserved in mammals, and moderately conserved in certain reptiles, amphibians, fish and birds. There are no orthologs of this LRRC27 gene in invertebrates

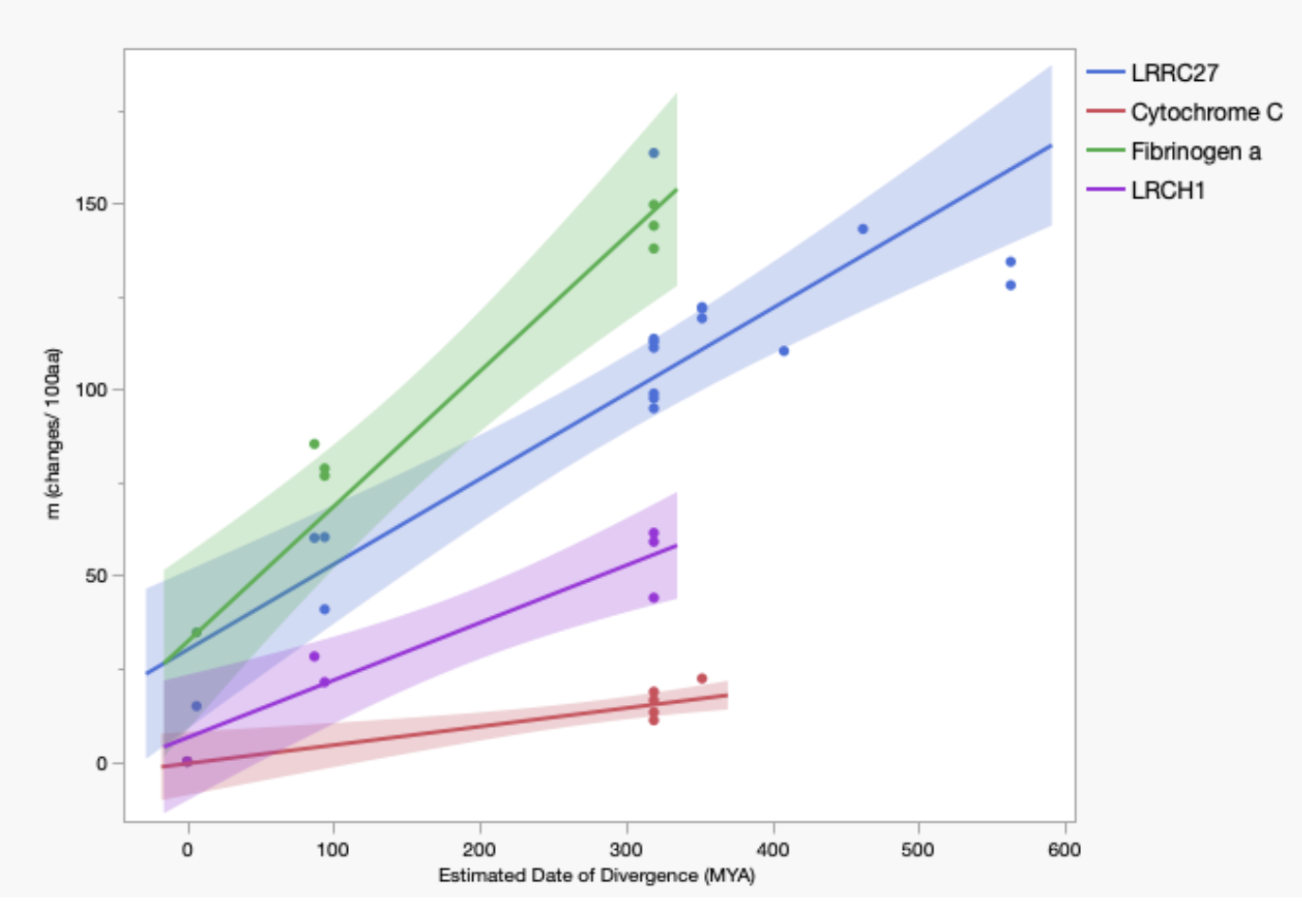
Corrected Sequence Divergence vs Estimated Date of Divergence of LRRC27, LRCH1, Cytochrome C, and Fibrinogen Alpha. Blue indicates LRRC27, red indicates Cytochrome C. Green indicates Fibrinogen Alpha and purple indicates LRCH1.

=== Phylogeny/History ===
LRRC27 and LRCH1 are neither evolving as quickly as Fibrinogen Alpha nor as slowly as Cytochrome C. LRCH1 appears to also be changing at a slower rate compared to LRRC27.

== Clinical Significance ==
Enriched LRRC27 expression is present in preeclampsia (PE). LRRC27 is overexpressed in platelets unique to PE, compared to a healthy pregnancy.

A single nucleotide polymorphism in LRRC27 is also significantly associated with the pathogenesis of primary open-angle glaucoma (POAG). Increased expression of LRRC27 with SNP rs116121322 was shown to be associated with POAG.

Another study attempting to characterize the variable responses to weight loss treatment also found that the expression of several genes, including LRRC27, were highly variable between weight loss treatment responders and non-responder groups.
