= ADH-1 =

Chemical compound

Clinical data
- Trade names: Exherin
- ATC code: none

Identifiers
- IUPAC name: L-Cysteinamide, N-acetyl-L-cysteinyl-L-histidyl-l-alanyl-L-valyl-, cyclic (1-5)-disulfide
- CAS Number: 229971-81-7
- PubChem CID: 9916058
- ChemSpider: 8091706
- UNII: B058ME29VU
- CompTox Dashboard (EPA): DTXSID4044036

Chemical and physical data
- Formula: C_{22}H_{34}N_{8}O_{6}S_{2}
- Molar mass: 570.68 g·mol^{−1}
- 3D model (JSmol): Interactive image
- SMILES: O=C(N[C@@H]1C(=O)N[C@H](C(=O)N[C@H](C(=O)N[C@H](C(=O)N[C@H](C(=O)N)CSSC1)C(C)C)C)Cc2c[nH]cn2)C
- InChI: InChI=1S/C22H34N8O6S2/c1-10(2)17-22(36)29-15(18(23)32)7-37-38-8-16(27-12(4)31)21(35)28-14(5-13-6-24-9-25-13)20(34)26-11(3)19(33)30-17/h6,9-11,14-17H,5,7-8H2,1-4H3,(H2,23,32)(H,24,25)(H,26,34)(H,27,31)(H,28,35)(H,29,36)(H,30,33)/t11-,14-,15-,16-,17-/m0/s1; Key:FQVLRGLGWNWPSS-BXBUPLCLSA-N

ADH-1 (proposed brand name Exherin) is a cyclic peptide antineoplastic drug developed by Adherex Technologies.

ADH-1 selectively and competitively binds to and blocks N-cadherin, which may result in disruption of tumor vasculature, inhibition of tumor cell growth, and the induction of tumor cell and endothelial cell apoptosis. N-cadherin, a cell- surface transmembrane glycoprotein of the cadherin superfamily of proteins involved in calcium-mediated cell–cell adhesion and signaling mechanisms; may be upregulated in some aggressive tumors and the endothelial cells and pericytes of some tumor blood vessels.

In 2006, Adherex and NCI formed a clinical trial agreement stating that NCI will sponsor clinical trials of ADH-1 in a variety of cancer types. ADH-1 received orphan drug status from the FDA in 2008.

In a pilot study (phase I trial), ADH-1 intravenous pretreatment before chemotherapy in metastatic melanoma completely destroyed tumors in half of patients. It is being investigated in phase II trials for advanced extremity melanoma.
