= Mary B. Kennedy =

American biochemist and neuroscientist

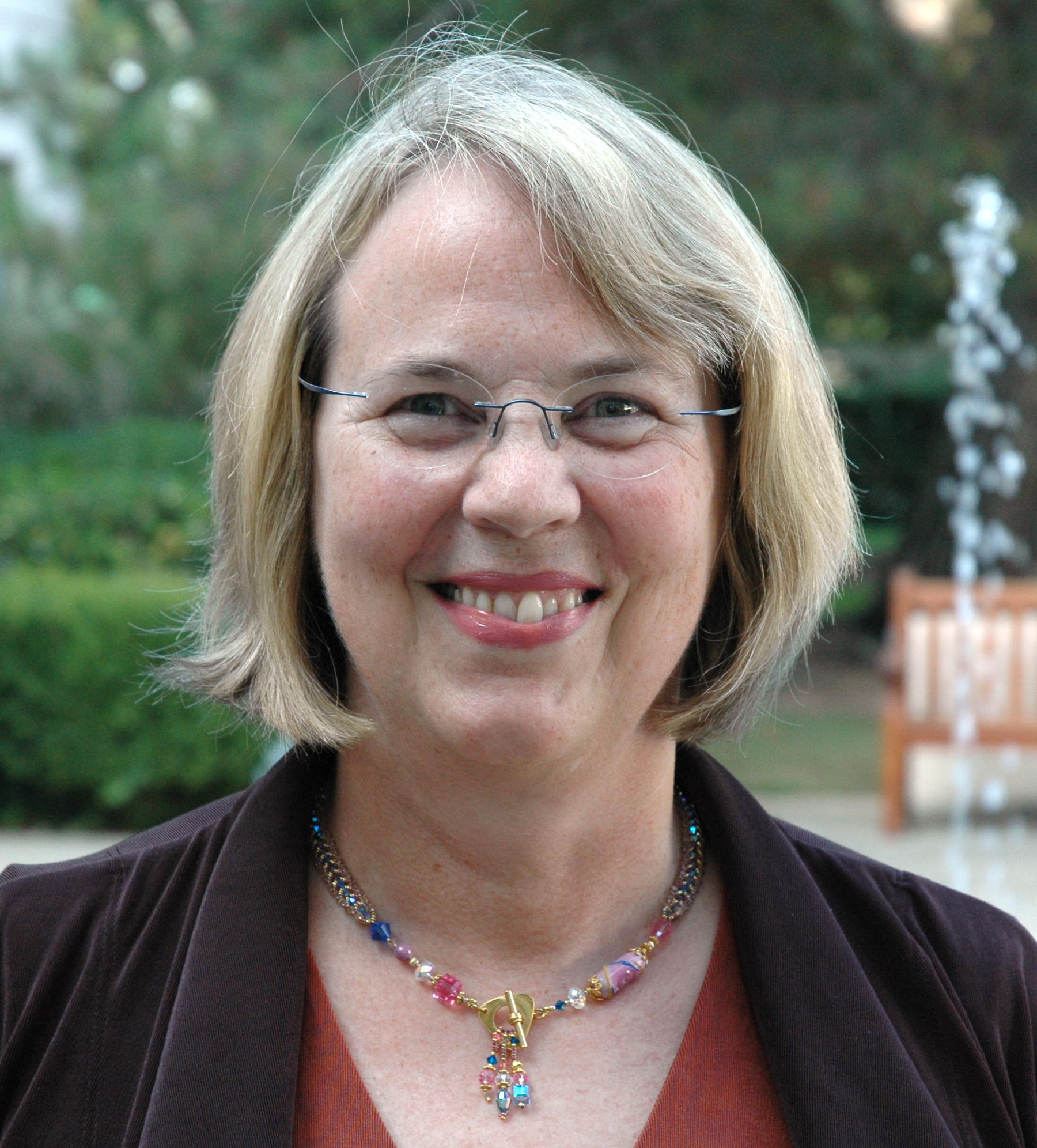
Mary B. Kennedy, Allen and Lenabelle Davis Professor of Biology, Caltech

Mary Bernadette Kennedy (born 1947) is an American biochemist and neuroscientist. She is a member of the American Academy of Arts and Sciences, and is the Allen and Lenabelle Davis Professor of Biology at the California Institute of Technology, where she has been a member of the faculty since 1981. Her research focuses on the molecular mechanisms of synaptic plasticity, the process underlying formation of memory in the central nervous system. Her lab uses biochemical and molecular biological methods to study the protein machinery within a structure called the postsynaptic density. Kennedy has published over 100 papers with over 20,000 total citations.

== Biography ==
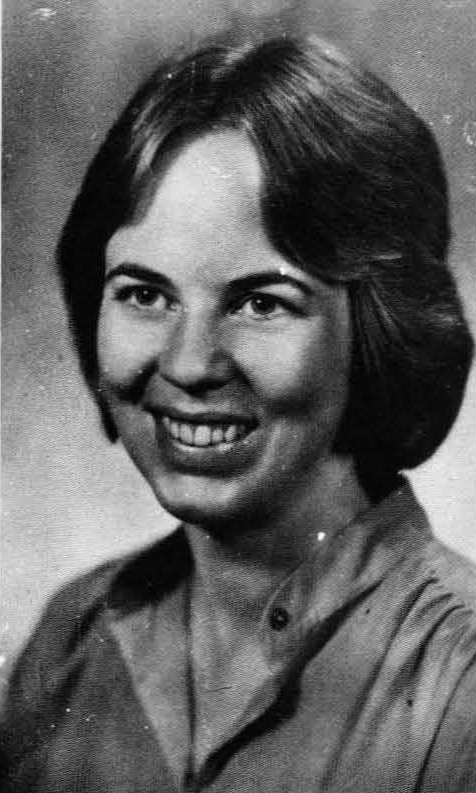
Kennedy in 1986

Kennedy was born on July 4, 1947, in Pontiac, in the US state of Michigan. Her family moved to South Bend, Indiana in 1953, where her father owned a shoe store, and her mother was a homemaker. She is the oldest of six siblings, with four sisters and a brother.

Kennedy received a Bachelor of Science degree in chemistry in 1969 from St. Mary's College in South Bend. In 1975, she earned a Ph.D. in biochemistry from Johns Hopkins University in the laboratory of William Lennarz. She moved into the field of neuroscience during postdoctoral fellowships at Harvard Medical School with Edward Kravitz, and then at Yale University with Paul Greengard. In 1981, she moved to Caltech as an assistant professor and was promoted to professor in 1992. She was named Allen and Lenabelle Davis Professor of Biology in 2002.

== Major scientific contributions ==
Her laboratory purified and characterized the synaptic signaling protein Calcium/calmodulin-dependent protein kinase II (CaMKII) in 1983 and showed that it is 1-2% of forebrain protein, is a major constituent of the postsynaptic density, and is regulated by autophosphorylation following activation by synaptic activity.

Her lab later used micro-sequencing, molecular cloning, and immunocytochemistry to identify the central PSD scaffold protein PSD-95 and its three repeated domains later termed PDZ domains. With Peter Seeburg, they then showed that the second PDZ domain binds a terminal S-X-V motif at the carboxyl tail of GluN2B, an NMDA receptor subunit. PDZ domains are now known to be ubiquitous in scaffold proteins where they immobilize other proteins by binding to their C-terminal ligands. Her work was the first discovery of a PDZ domain and established that the PSD is a scaffold containing signaling enzymes and receptors that function as a molecular machine to regulate synaptic strength.

Recent work concerns the role of the multifunctional PSD protein synGAP in regulating AMPA receptor insertion into the membrane and trapping of AMPA receptors in the PSD. She is collaborating with Tom Bartol and Terry Sejnowski at the Salk Institute to create kinetic models of biochemical signaling in postsynaptic spines.

== Honors and awards ==
- 1985 McKnight Neuroscience Investigator Award
- 1991 Fellow of the American Association for the Advancement of Science
- 1991 Faculty Award for Women Scientists and Engineers (NSF)
- 1992 Javits Neuroscience Investigator Award (NIH)
- 1999 Special Lecturer, Annual Meeting of the Society for Neuroscience
- 2002 Elected Fellow of the American Academy of Arts and Sciences
- 2006 Fondation Ipsen Prize in Neuronal Plasticity
