= LRRC7 =

Protein found in humans

Identifiers
- Aliases: LRRC7, DENSIN, leucine rich repeat containing 7
- External IDs: OMIM: 614453; MGI: 2676665; GeneCards: LRRC7

Gene location (Human)
Chr.	Chromosome 1 (human)
Band	1p31.1	Start	69,567,922 bp
Band	1p31.1	End	70,151,945 bp

Gene location (Mouse)
Chr.	Chromosome 3 (mouse)
Band	3|3 H4	Start	157,788,528 bp
Band	3|3 H4	End	158,267,858 bp
RNA expression pattern
Bgee	Human / Mouse (ortholog); Top expressed in: Brodmann area 23; primary visual cortex; nucleus accumbens; middle temporal gyrus; Brodmann area 9; ganglionic eminence; caudate nucleus; putamen; Brodmann area 46; hippocampus proper / Top expressed in: medial geniculate nucleus; medial dorsal nucleus; lateral geniculate nucleus; olfactory tubercle; Rostral migratory stream; dentate gyrus of hippocampal formation granule cell; piriform cortex; primary motor cortex; Region I of hippocampus proper; cingulate gyrus; More reference expression data
BioGPS	n/a
Gene ontology
Molecular function	protein binding; ionotropic glutamate receptor binding
Cellular component	cell junction; postsynaptic membrane; synapse; membrane; postsynaptic density; extracellular region; specific granule lumen; cytoplasm; plasma membrane; neuron projection; cell-cell junction; ionotropic glutamate receptor complex; basolateral plasma membrane; axon initial segment; cytosol
Biological process	neutrophil degranulation; signal transduction; positive regulation of neuron projection development; receptor clustering; establishment or maintenance of epithelial cell apical/basal polarity; receptor localization to synapse; cell-cell adhesion; neurotransmitter receptor transport, endosome to postsynaptic membrane; neurotransmitter receptor transport postsynaptic membrane to endosome; MAPK cascade; regulation of NMDA receptor activity
Sources:Amigo / QuickGO
Orthologs
Databases	NCBI: entry; OMA: entry
Species	Human	Mouse
Entrez	57554	242274
Ensembl	ENSG00000033122	ENSMUSG00000028176
UniProt	Q96NW7	Q80TE7
RefSeq (mRNA)	NM_020794; NM_001330635; NM_001350216; NM_001366836; NM_001366837 NM_001366838; NM_001366839; NM_001366840; NM_001366841; NM_001366842; NM_001370785	NM_001081358; NM_001291452; NM_001291453; NM_001370781; NM_001370782
RefSeq (protein)	NP_001317564; NP_001337145; NP_001353765; NP_001353766; NP_001353767 NP_001353768; NP_001353769; NP_001353770; NP_001353771; NP_001357714	NP_001074827; NP_001278381; NP_001278382; NP_001357710; NP_001357711
Location (UCSC)	Chr 1: 69.57 – 70.15 Mb	Chr 3: 157.79 – 158.27 Mb
PubMed search
- Wikidata
View/Edit Human	View/Edit Mouse

Leucine rich repeat containing 7 also known as LRRC7, Densin-180, or LAP1 is a protein which in humans is encoded by the LRRC7 gene.

== Structure ==
Found to be densely associated to the postsynaptic density (PSD), it has been characterised as a 188 kDa (originally thought to be 180 kDa, hence nomenclature), 1495 residues long, brain-specific protein containing 16 leucine-rich repeats (LRRs) within the 500 N-terminal residues, and one Psd95/Discs large/Zona occludens (PDZ) domain within the 200 C-terminal residues. Originally postulated to have an apparent transmembrane domain, it has now been shown that the protein has numerous phosphorylation sites both N- and C-term of this domain, and that protein is therefore cytoplasmic; palmitoylation is thought to occur near the N-terminus of the protein which would account for localisation of the protein at the PSD.

== Interactions ==
LRRC7 has been shown to interact with CDH2.

The currently exposed interactions of Densin-180 portray the protein as a promiscuous player amongst key synaptic players, fitting with the original observation of the protein’s dense presence among core PSD proteins by Mary B. Kennedy's Laboratory. Identified interaction partners include: CaMKII-alpha, alpha-Actinin and NR2B (via CaMKII-alpha), Cav1.3 (L-type Ca2+) channels, MAGUIN-1, Shank, PSD-95 (via Shank and MAGUIN-1), beta-Catenin, delta-Catenins and NCadherin (via the Catenins). The nature and function of these interactions, detailed in tables 1-1 and 1-2, portray Densin-180 as a key interactor in the midst of receptor proteins, scaffolding proteins and structural proteins. [number of sources - referenced in - Subcellular localisation of recombinant Densin-180 clones expressed in HEK293 TSA cells Ranatunga, J.M. (2011) Subcellular localisation of recombinant Densin-180 clones expressed in HEK293 TSA cells. Masters thesis, UCL (University College London). http://discovery.ucl.ac.uk/1322972/]

It is also quite possible that Densin-180 dimerises or multimerises through interactions between its PDZ domain and its own terminal amino acid residues. [Subcellular localisation of recombinant Densin-180 clones expressed in HEK293 TSA cells Ranatunga, J.M. (2011) Subcellular localisation of recombinant Densin-180 clones expressed in HEK293 TSA cells. Masters thesis, UCL (University College London). http://discovery.ucl.ac.uk/1322972/]
