= Cadherin-2 =

Protein found in humans

CDH2
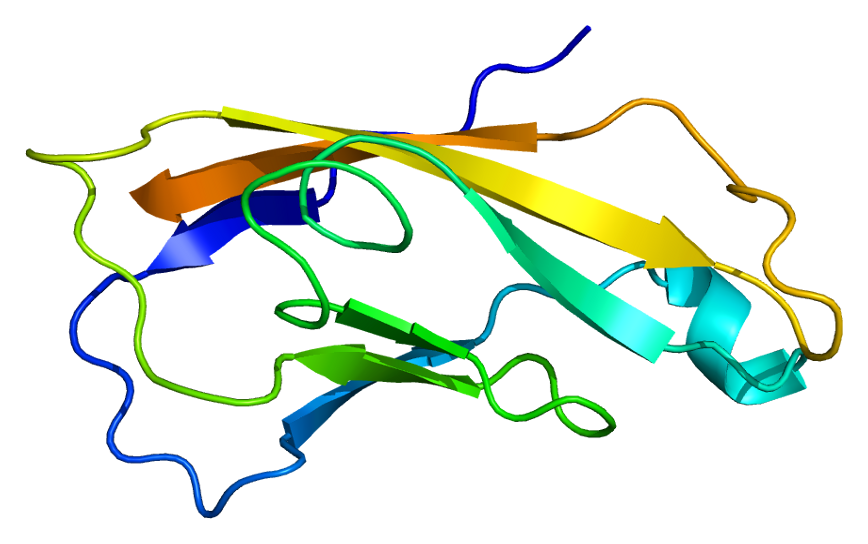

Identifiers
- Aliases: CDH2, CD325, CDHN, CDw325, NCAD, cadherin 2, ACOGS, ARVD14
- External IDs: OMIM: 114020; MGI: 88355; GeneCards: CDH2
Available structures
PDB	Ortholog search: PDBe RCSB
PDB	List of PDB id codes 1NCG, 1NCH, 1NCI, 1NCJ, 1OP4, 2QVI, 3Q2W, 4NUM, 4NUP, 4NUQ

Gene location (Human)
Chr.	Chromosome 18 (human)
Band	18q12.1	Start	27,932,879 bp
Band	18q12.1	End	28,177,946 bp

Gene location (Mouse)
Chr.	Chromosome 18 (mouse)
Band	18 A1|18 10.1 cM	Start	16,721,934 bp
Band	18 A1|18 10.1 cM	End	16,942,303 bp
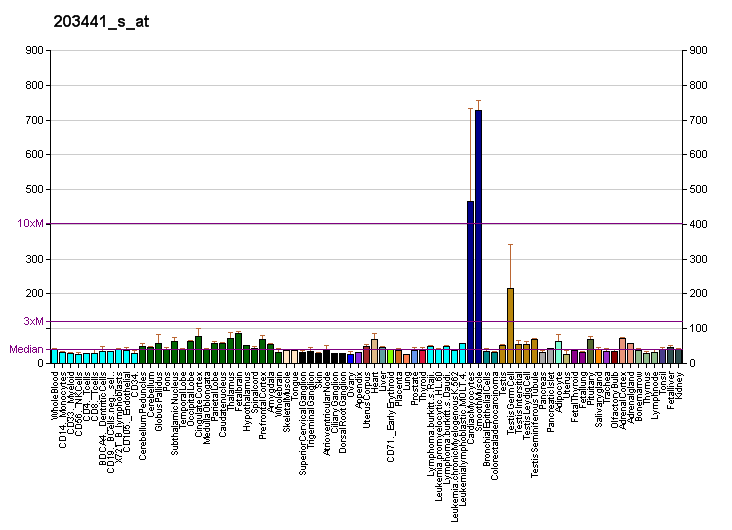

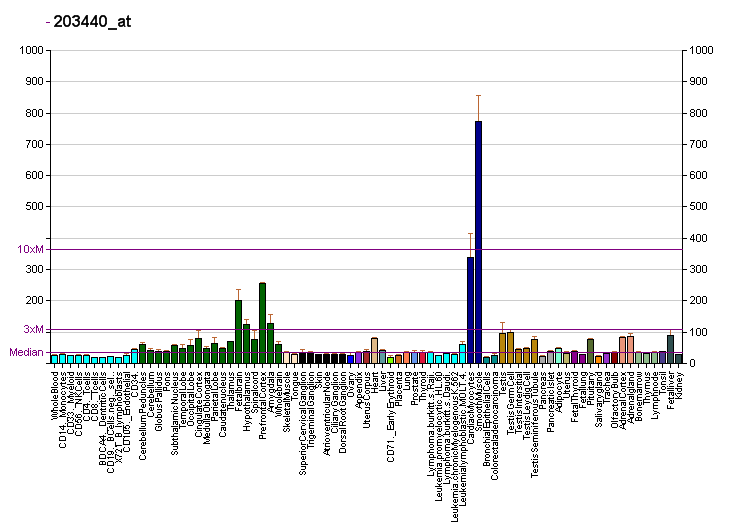
RNA expression pattern
Bgee	Human / Mouse (ortholog); Top expressed in: right ventricle; ventricular zone; stromal cell of endometrium; myocardium; myocardium of left ventricle; endothelial cell; ganglionic eminence; cardiac muscle tissue of right atrium; Brodmann area 23; middle temporal gyrus / Top expressed in: median eminence; atrium; lateral septal nucleus; myocardium of ventricle; ventromedial nucleus; lateral geniculate nucleus; cardiac muscle tissue of left ventricle; dorsomedial hypothalamic nucleus; mammillary body; arcuate nucleus; More reference expression data
BioGPS	More reference expression data
Gene ontology
Molecular function	calcium ion binding; gamma-catenin binding; metal ion binding; protein binding; enzyme binding; protein phosphatase binding; alpha-catenin binding; protein kinase binding; beta-catenin binding; identical protein binding; cytoskeletal protein binding; protein homodimerization activity; cadherin binding
Cellular component	cytoplasm; integral component of membrane; membrane; intercalated disc; cell-cell junction; focal adhesion; plasma membrane raft; adherens junction; plasma membrane; synapse; basolateral plasma membrane; apical plasma membrane; cortical actin cytoskeleton; catenin complex; fascia adherens; extracellular exosome; lamellipodium; postsynaptic density; sarcolemma; endoplasmic reticulum lumen; cell surface; cell junction; extracellular matrix; integral component of plasma membrane; neuron projection; apical part of cell; collagen-containing extracellular matrix; integral component of presynaptic active zone membrane; integral component of postsynaptic specialization membrane
Biological process	calcium-dependent cell-cell adhesion via plasma membrane cell adhesion molecules; heterophilic cell-cell adhesion via plasma membrane cell adhesion molecules; blood vessel morphogenesis; homeostasis of number of cells; positive regulation of muscle cell differentiation; regulation of postsynaptic density protein 95 clustering; glial cell differentiation; neuroepithelial cell differentiation; cell-cell adhesion mediated by cadherin; radial glial cell differentiation; neuronal stem cell population maintenance; regulation of oligodendrocyte progenitor proliferation; telencephalon development; neuroligin clustering involved in postsynaptic membrane assembly; positive regulation of synaptic vesicle clustering; cell adhesion; regulation of signal transduction; cerebral cortex development; striated muscle cell differentiation; adherens junction organization; cell migration; negative regulation of canonical Wnt signaling pathway; positive regulation of MAPK cascade; homophilic cell adhesion via plasma membrane adhesion molecules; brain morphogenesis; post-translational protein modification; protein localization to plasma membrane; cell morphogenesis; cell-cell junction assembly; synapse assembly; regulation of axonogenesis; regulation of synaptic transmission, glutamatergic; cell-cell adhesion
Sources:Amigo / QuickGO
Orthologs
Databases	NCBI: entry; OMA: entry
Species	Human	Mouse
Entrez	1000	12558
Ensembl	ENSG00000170558	ENSMUSG00000024304
UniProt	P19022	P15116
RefSeq (mRNA)	NM_001308176; NM_001792	NM_007664
RefSeq (protein)	NP_001295105; NP_001783; NP_001783.2	NP_031690
Location (UCSC)	Chr 18: 27.93 – 28.18 Mb	Chr 18: 16.72 – 16.94 Mb
PubMed search
- Wikidata
View/Edit Human	View/Edit Mouse

Cadherin-2 also known as Neural cadherin (N-cadherin), is a protein that in humans is encoded by the CDH2 gene. CDH2 has also been designated as CD325 (cluster of differentiation 325). Cadherin-2 is a transmembrane protein expressed in multiple tissues and functions to mediate cell–cell adhesion. In cardiac muscle, Cadherin-2 is an integral component in adherens junctions residing at intercalated discs, which function to mechanically and electrically couple adjacent cardiomyocytes. Alterations in expression and integrity of Cadherin-2 has been observed in various forms of disease, including human dilated cardiomyopathy. Variants in CDH2 have also been identified to cause a syndromic neurodevelopmental disorder.

== Structure ==
Cadherin-2 is a protein with molecular weight of 99.7 kDa, and 906 amino acids in length. Cadherin-2, a classical cadherin from the cadherin superfamily, is composed of five extracellular cadherin repeats, a transmembrane region and a highly conserved cytoplasmic tail. Cadherin-2, as well as other cadherins, interact with Cadherin-2 on an adjacent cell in an anti-parallel conformation, thus creating a linear, adhesive "zipper" between cells.

== Function ==
Cadherin-2, originally named Neural cadherin for its role in neural tissue, plays a role in neurons and later was found to also play a role in cardiac muscle and in cancer metastasis. Cadherin-2 is a transmembrane, homophilic glycoprotein belonging to the calcium-dependent cell adhesion molecule family. These proteins have extracellular domains that mediate homophilic interactions between adjacent cells, and C-terminal, cytoplasmic tails that mediate binding to catenins, which in turn interact with the actin cytoskeleton.

=== Role in development ===
Cadherin-2 plays a role in development as a calcium dependent cell–cell adhesion glycoprotein that functions during gastrulation and is required for establishment of left-right asymmetry.

Cadherin-2 is widely expressed in the embryo post-implantation, showing high levels in the mesoderm with sustained expression through adulthood. Cadherin-2 mutation during development has the most significant effect on cell adhesion in the primitive heart; dissociated myocytes and abnormal heart tube development occur. Cadherin-2 plays a role in the development of the vertebrate heart at the transition of epithelial cells to trabecular and compact myocardial cell layer formation. An additional study showed that myocytes expressing a dominant negative Cadherin-2 mutant showed significant abnormalities in myocyte distribution and migration towards the endocardium, resulting in defects in trabecular formation within the myocardium.

=== Role in cardiac muscle ===
In cardiac muscle, Cadherin-2 is found at intercalated disc structures which provide end-on cell–cell connections that facilitate mechanical and electrical coupling between adjacent cardiomyocytes. Within intercalated discs are three types of junctions: adherens junctions, desmosomes and gap junctions; Cadherin-2 is an essential component in adherens junctions, which enables cell–cell adhesion and force transmission across the sarcolemma. Cadherin-2 complexed to catenins has been described as a master regulator of intercalated disc function. Cadherin-2 appears at cell–cell junctions prior to gap junction formation, and is critical for normal myofibrillogenesis. Expression of a mutant form of Cadherin-2 harboring a large deletion in the extracellular domain inhibited the function of endogenous Cadherin-2 in adult ventricular cardiomyocytes, and neighboring cardiomyocytes lost cell–cell contact and gap junction plaques as well.

Mouse models employing transgenesis have highlighted the function of N-cadherin in cardiac muscle. Mice with altered expression of N-cadherin and/or E-cadherin showed a dilated cardiomyopathy phenotype, likely due to malfunction of intercalated discs. In agreement with this, mice with ablation of N-cadherin in adult hearts via a cardiac-specific tamoxifen-inducible Cre N-cadherin transgene showed disrupted assembly of intercalated discs, dilated cardiomyopathy, impaired cardiac function, decreased sarcomere length, increased Z-line thickness, decreases in connexin 43, and a loss in muscular tension. Mice died within two months of transgene expression, mainly due to spontaneous Ventricular tachycardia. Further analysis of N-cadherin knockout mice revealed that the arrhythmias were likely due to ion channel remodeling and aberrant Kv1.5 channel function. These animals showed a prolonged action potential duration, reduced density of inward rectifier potassium channel and decreased expression of Kv1.5, KCNE2 and cortactin combined with disrupted actin cytoskeleton at the sarcolemma.

=== Role in neurons ===
In neural cells, at certain central nervous system synapses, presynaptic to postsynaptic adhesion is mediated at least in part by Cadherin-2. N-cadherins interact with catenins to play an important role in learning and memory (For full article see Cadherin-catenin complex in learning and memory). Loss of N-cadherin is also associated with attention-deficit hyperactivity disorder in humans, and impaired synaptic functioning.

=== Role in cancer metastasis ===
Cadherin-2 is commonly found in cancer cells and provides a mechanism for transendothelial migration. When a cancer cell adheres to the endothelial cells of a blood vessel it up-regulates the src kinase pathway, which phosphorylates beta-catenins attached to both Cadherin-2 (this protein) and E-cadherins. This causes the intercellular connection between two adjacent endothelial cells to fail and allows the cancer cell to slip through.

== Clinical significance ==
Variants in CDH2 have been identified to cause a syndromic neurodevelopmental disorder characterized by Corpus callosum, axon, cardiac, ocular, and genital differences.

One study investigating genetic underpinnings of obsessive-compulsive disorder and Tourette disorder found that while CDH2 variants are likely not disease-causing as single entities, they may confer risk when examined as part of a panel of related cell–cell adhesion genes. Further studies in larger cohorts will be required to unequivocally determine this.

In human dilated cardiomyopathy, it was shown that Cadherin-2 expression was enhanced and arranged in a disarrayed fashion, suggesting that disorganization of Cadherin-2 protein in heart disease may be a component of remodeling.

== Interactions ==
Cadherin-2 has been shown to interact with:

- Beta-catenin,
- CDH11,
- type IIb RPTPs including PTPmu (CTNND1),
- CTNNA1,
- LRRC7,
- PTPRM)
- PTPrho (PTPRT), and
- Plakoglobin.
- XIRP1
- SCARB2

== See also ==
- ADH-1
