= Cadherin =

Calcium-dependent cell adhesion molecule

Principal interactions of structural proteins at cadherin-based adherens junction. Actin filaments are linked to α-actinin and to the membrane through vinculin. The head domain of vinculin is associated with E-cadherin via α-, β-, and γ-catenins. The tail domain of vinculin binds to membrane lipids and to actin filaments.

Cadherins (named for "calcium-dependent adhesion") are cell adhesion molecules important in forming adherens junctions that let cells adhere to each other. Cadherins are a class of type-1 transmembrane proteins, and they depend on calcium (Ca^{2+}) ions to function, hence their name. Cell-cell adhesion is mediated by extracellular cadherin domains, whereas the intracellular cytoplasmic tail associates with numerous adaptors and signaling proteins, collectively referred to as the cadherin adhesome.

== Background ==
The cadherin family is essential in maintaining cell-cell contact and regulating cytoskeletal complexes. The cadherin superfamily includes cadherins, protocadherins, desmogleins, desmocollins, and more. In structure, they share cadherin repeats, which are the extracellular Ca^{2+}-binding domains. There are multiple classes of cadherin molecules, each designated with a prefix for tissues with which it associates. Classical cadherins maintain the tone of tissues by forming a homodimer in cis, while desmosomal cadherins are heterodimeric. The intracellular portion of classical cadherins interacts with a complex of proteins that allows connection to the actin cytoskeleton. Although classical cadherins take a role in cell layer formation and structure formation, desmosomal cadherins focus on resisting cell damage. Desmosomal cadherins maintain the function of desmosomes, that is to overturn the mechanical stress of the tissues. Similar to classical cadherins, desmosomal cadherins have a single transmembrane domain, five EC repeats, and an intracellular domain. There are two types of desmosomal cadherins: desmogleins and desmocollins. These contain an intracellular anchor and cadherin-like sequence (ICS). The adaptor proteins that associate with desmosomal cadherins are plakoglobin (related to $\beta$-catenin), plakophilins (p120 catenin subfamily), and desmoplakins. The major function of desmoplakins is to bind to intermediate filament by interacting with plakoglobin, which attach to the ICS of desmogleins, desmocollins and plakophilins. Atypical cadherins, such as CELSR1, retain the extracellular repeats and binding activities of the other cadherins, but may otherwise differ significantly in structure, and are typically involved in transmitting developmental signals rather than adhesion.

Cells containing a specific cadherin subtype tend to cluster together to the exclusion of other types, both in cell culture and during development. For example, cells containing N-cadherin tend to cluster with other N-cadherin-expressing cells. However, mixing speed in cell culture experiments can effect the extent of homotypic specificity. In addition, several groups have observed heterotypic binding affinity (i.e., binding of different types of cadherin together) in various assays. One current model proposes that cells distinguish cadherin subtypes based on kinetic specificity rather than thermodynamic specificity, as different types of cadherin homotypic bonds have different lifetimes.

== Structure ==
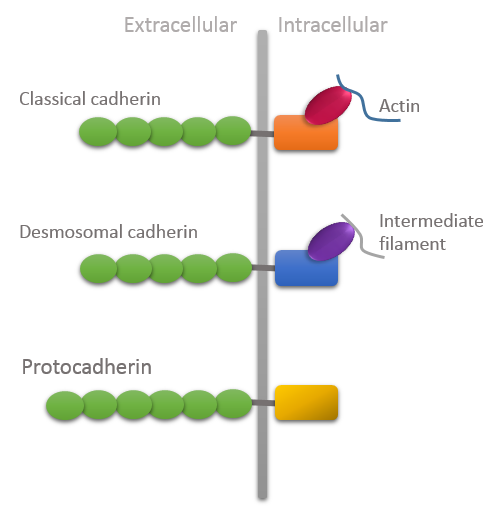
Domain organization of different types of cadherins

Cadherins are synthesized as polypeptides and undergo many post-translational modifications to become the proteins which mediate cell-cell adhesion and recognition. These polypeptides are approximately 720–750 amino acids long. Each cadherin has a small C-terminal cytoplasmic component, a transmembrane component, and the remaining bulk of the protein is extra-cellular (outside the cell). The transmembrane component consists of single chain glycoprotein repeats. Because cadherins are Ca^{2+} dependent, they have five tandem extracellular domain repeats that act as the binding site for Ca^{2+} ions. Their extracellular domain interacts with two separate trans dimer conformations: strand-swap dimers (S-dimers) and X-dimers. To date, over 100 types of cadherins in humans have been identified and sequenced.

The functionality of cadherins relies upon the formation of two identical subunits, known as homodimers. The homodimeric cadherins create cell-cell adhesion with cadherins present in the membranes of other cells through changing conformation from cis-dimers to trans-dimers. Once the cell-cell adhesion between cadherins present in the cell membranes of two different cells has formed, adherens junctions can then be made when protein complexes, usually composed of α-, β-, and γ-catenins, bind to the cytoplasmic portion of the cadherin. Regulatory proteins include p-120 catenin, $\alpha$-catenin, $\beta$-catenin, and vinculin. Binding of p-120 catenin and $\beta$-catenin to the homodimer increases the stability of the classical cadherin. $\alpha$-catenin is engaged by p120-catenin complex, where vinculin is recruited to take a role in indirect association with actin cytoskeleton. However, cadherin-catenin complex can also bind directly to the actin without the help of vinculin. Moreover, the strength of cadherin adhesion can increase by dephosphorylation of p120 catenin and the binding of $\alpha$-catenin and vinculin.

== Function ==
=== Development ===
Cadherins behave as both receptors and ligands for other molecules. During development, their behavior assists at properly positioning cells: they are responsible for the separation of the different tissue layers and for cellular migration. In the very early stages of development, E-cadherins (epithelial cadherin) are most greatly expressed. Many cadherins are specified for specific functions in the cell, and they are differentially expressed in a developing embryo. For example, during neurulation, when a neural plate forms in an embryo, the tissues residing near the cranial neural folds have decreased N-cadherin expression. Conversely, the expression of the N-cadherins remains unchanged in other regions of the neural tube that is located on the anterior-posterior axis of the vertebrate. N-cadherins have different functions that maintain the cell structure, cell-cell adhesion, internal adhesions. They participate greatly in keeping the ability of the structured heart due to pumping and release blood. Because of the contribution of N-cadherins adhering strongly between the cardiomyocytes, the heart can overcome the fracture, deformation, and fatigue that can result from the blood pressure. N-cadherin takes part in the development of the heart during embryogenesis, especially in sorting out of the precardiac mesoderm. N-cadherins are robustly expressed in precardiac mesoderm, but they do not take a role in cardiac linage. An embryo with N-cadherin mutation still forms the primitive heart tube; however, N-cadherin-deficient mice will have difficulties in maintaining the cardiomyocytes development. The myocytes of these mice will end up with dissociated myocytes surrounding the endocardial cell layer when they cannot preserve the cell adhesion due to the heart starting to pump. As a result, the cardiac outflow tract will be blocked, causing cardiac swelling.

The expression of different types of cadherins in the cells varies, dependent upon the specific differentiation and specification of an organism during development. Cadherins play a vital role in the migration of cells through the epithelial–mesenchymal transition, which requires cadherins to form adherents junctions between neighboring cells. In neural crest cells, which are transient cells that arise in the developing organism during gastrulation and function in the patterning of the vertebrate body plan, the cadherins are necessary to allow migration of cells to form tissues or organs. In addition, cadherins that are responsible in the epithelial–mesenchymal transition event in early development have also been shown to be critical in the reprogramming of specified adult cells into a pluripotent state, forming induced pluripotent stem cells (iPSCs).

After development, cadherins play a role in maintaining cell and tissue structure, and in cellular movement. Regulation of cadherin expression can occur through promoter methylation, among other epigenetic mechanisms.

=== Tumour metastasis ===
The E-cadherin–catenin complex plays a key role in cellular adhesion; loss of this function has been associated with increased invasiveness and metastasis of tumors. The suppression of E-cadherin expression is regarded as one of the main molecular events responsible for dysfunction in cell-cell adhesion, which can lead to local invasion and ultimately tumor development. Because E-cadherins play an important role in tumor suppression, they are also referred to as the "suppressors of invasion".

Additionally, the overexpression of type 5, 6, and 17 cadherins alone or in combination can lead to cancer metastasis, and ongoing research aims to block their ability to function as ligands for integral membrane proteins.

=== Correlation to cancer ===
It has been discovered that cadherins and other additional factors are correlated to the formation and growth of some cancers and how a tumor continues to grow. The E-cadherins, known as the epithelial cadherins, are on the surface of one cell and can bind with those of the same kind on another to form bridges. The loss of these cell adhesion molecules is causally involved in the formation of epithelial types of cancers such as carcinomas. The changes in any types of cadherin expression may not only control tumor cell adhesion, but also may affect signal transduction, leading to uncontrollable cancer cell growth.

In epithelial cell cancers, disrupted cell-to-cell adhesion might lead to the development of secondary malignant growths; they are distant from the primary site of cancer and can result from the abnormalities in the expression of E-cadherins or its associated catenins. CAMs such as the cadherin glycoproteins that normally function as the glue that holds cells together, act as important mediators of cell-to-cell interactions. E-cadherins, on the surface of all epithelial cells, are linked to the actin cytoskeleton through interactions with catenins in the cytoplasm. Thus, anchored to the cytoskeleton, E-cadherins on the surface of one cell can bind with those on another to form bridges. In epithelial cell cancers, disrupted cell-cell adhesion that might lead to metastases can result from abnormalities in the expression of E-cadherin or its associated catenins.

=== Correlation to endometrium and embryogenesis ===
This family of glycoproteins is responsible for calcium-dependent mechanism of intracellular adhesion. E-cadherins are crucial in embryogenesis during several processes, including gastrulation, neurulation, and organogenesis. Furthermore, suppression of E-cadherins impairs intracellular adhesion. The levels of these molecules increase during the luteal phase, while their expression is regulated by progesterone with endometrial calcitonin.

== Types ==
Cadherin domain (repeat)
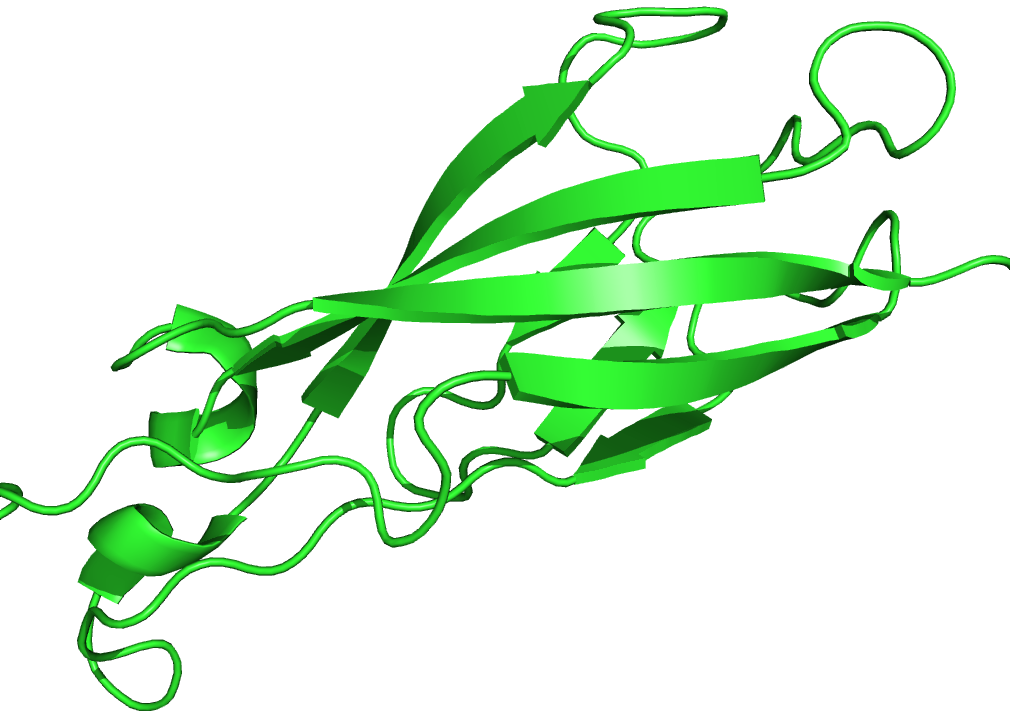
- Ribbon representation of a repeating unit in the extracellular E-cadherin ectodomain of the mouse (PDB: 3Q2V)

Identifiers
- Symbol: Cadherin
- Pfam: PF00028
- InterPro: IPR002126
- SMART: CA
- PROSITE: PDOC00205
- SCOP2: 1nci / SCOPe / SUPFAM
- Membranome: 114
Available protein structures:
- PDB: IPR002126 PF00028 (ECOD; PDBsum)
- AlphaFold: IPR002126; PF00028
- See Pfam CL0159 for other Cadherin families.

There are said to be over 100 different types of cadherins found in vertebrates, which can be classified into four groups: classical, desmosomal, protocadherins, and unconventional. This large diversity is accomplished by multiple cadherin-encoding genes, combined with alternative RNA splicing mechanisms. Invertebrates contain fewer than 20 types of cadherins.

=== Classical ===
Different members of the cadherin family are found in different locations.

- CDH1 – E-cadherin (epithelial): E-cadherins are found in epithelial tissue; not to be confused with the APC/C activator protein CDH1. E-cadherins play a vital role in cancer formation, as deregulation of E-cadherin functions is a crucial step in the formation of breast cancer tumors.
- CDH2 – N-cadherin (neural): N-cadherins are found in neurons
- CDH12 – cadherin 12, type 2 (N-cadherin 2)
- CDH3 – P-cadherin (placental): P-cadherins are found in the placenta.

=== Desmosomal ===
- Desmoglein (DSG1, DSG2, DSG3, DSG4)
- Desmocollin (DSC1, DSC2, DSC3)

=== Protocadherins ===
Protocadherins are the largest mammalian subgroup of the cadherin superfamily of homophilic cell-adhesion proteins.

- PCDH1
- PCDH7
- PCDH8
- PCDH9
- PCDH10
- PCDH11X/11Y
- PCDH12
- PCDH15
- PCDH17
- PCDH18
- PCDH19
- PCDH20
- PCDHA1
- PCDHA2
- PCDHA3
- PCDHA4
- PCDHA5
- PCDHA6
- PCDHA7
- PCDHA8
- PCDHA9
- PCDHA10
- PCDHA11
- PCDHA12
- PCDHA13
- PCDHAC1
- PCDHAC2
- PCDHB1
- PCDHB2
- PCDHB3
- PCDHB4
- PCDHB5
- PCDHB6
- PCDHB7
- PCDHB8
- PCDHB9
- PCDHB10
- PCDHB11
- PCDHB12
- PCDHB13
- PCDHB14
- PCDHB15
- PCDHB16
- PCDHB17
- PCDHB18
- PCDHGA1
- PCDHGA2
- PCDHGA3
- PCDHGA4
- PCDHGA5
- PCDHGA6
- PCDHGA7
- PCDHGA8
- PCDHGA9
- PCDHGA10
- PCDHGA11
- PCDHGA12
- PCDHGB1
- PCDHGB2
- PCDHGB3
- PCDHGB4
- PCDHGB5
- PCDHGB6
- PCDHGB7
- PCDHGC3
- PCDHGC4
- PCDHGC5
- FAT
- FAT2
- FAT4

=== Unconventional/ungrouped ===
- CDH4 – R-cadherin (retinal)
- CDH5 – VE-cadherin (vascular endothelial)
- CDH6 – K-cadherin (kidney)
- CDH7 – cadherin 7, type 2
- CDH8 – cadherin 8, type 2
- CDH9 – cadherin 9, type 2 (T1-cadherin)
- CDH10 – cadherin 10, type 2 (T2-cadherin)
- CDH11 – OB-cadherin (osteoblast)
- CDH13 – T-cadherin – H-cadherin (heart)
- CDH15 – M-cadherin (myotubule)
- CDH16 – KSP-cadherin
- CDH17 – LI cadherin (liver-intestine)
- CDH18 – cadherin 18, type 2
- CDH19 – cadherin 19, type 2
- CDH20 – cadherin 20, type 2
- CDH23 – cadherin 23 (neurosensory epithelium)
- CDH22, CDH24, CDH26, CDH28
- CELSR1, CELSR2, CELSR3
- CLSTN1, CLSTN2, CLSTN3
- DCHS1, DCHS2,
- LOC389118
- PCLKC
- RESDA1
- RET

== See also ==
- Aron Moscona
- Masatoshi Takeichi
- Catenin
- List of target antigens in pemphigus
