= Protocadherin =

Protocadherin, cytoplasmic
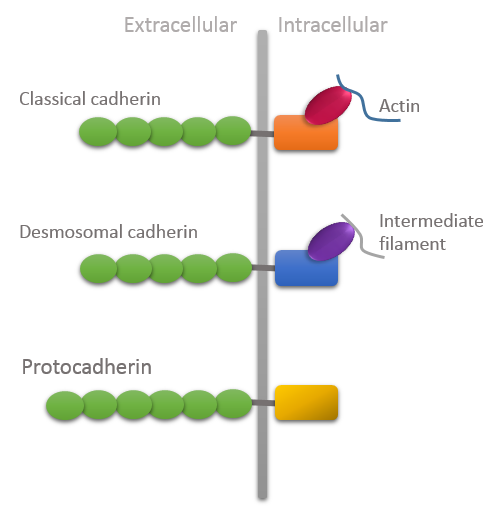
- Domain organization of different types of cadherins showing unique features of protocadherins: Extracellular domain is longer and intracellular domain lacks attachment with cytoskeleton.

Identifiers
- Symbol: PDCH
- Pfam: PF08374
- InterPro: IPR013585
- Membranome: 114
Available protein structures:
- PDB: IPR013585 PF08374 (ECOD; PDBsum)
- AlphaFold: IPR013585; PF08374

Protocadherins (Pcdhs) are the largest mammalian subgroup of the cadherin superfamily of homophilic cell-adhesion proteins. They were discovered by Shintaro Suzuki's group, when they used PCR to find new members of the cadherin family. The PCR fragments that corresponded to protocadherins were found in vertebrate and invertebrate species. This prevalence in a wide range of species suggested that the fragments were part of an ancient cadherin and were thus termed "Protocadherins" as the "first cadherins". Of the approximately 70 Pcdh genes identified in mammalian genomes, over 50 are located in tightly linked gene clusters on the same chromosome. Until recently, it was assumed that this kind of organization can only be found in vertebrates, but Octopus bimaculoides has 168 genes of which nearly three-quarters are found in tandem clusters with the two largest clusters compromising 31 and 17 genes, respectively.

== Classification ==
In mammals, two types of Pcdh genes have been defined: the non-clustered Pcdhs which are scattered throughout the genome; and the clustered Pcdhs organized in three gene clusters designated α, β, γ which in mouse genome comprises 14, 22 and 22, respectively, large variable exons arrayed in tandem. Each exon is transcribed from its owner promoter and encodes: the entire extracellular domain, a transmembrane domain, and a short and variable intracellular domain of the corresponding Pcdh protein which differs from the Cadherin intracellular domain due to lack of attachment to the cytoskeleton through catenins.

Moreover, these clustered Pcdh genes are predominantly expressed in the developing nervous system and since different subsets of Pcdhs genes are differentially expressed in individual neurons, a vast cell surface diversity may arise from this combinatorial expression. This has led to speculation and further to the proposal that Pcdhs may provide a synaptic-address code for neuronal connectivity or a single-cell barcode for self-recognition/self-avoidance similar to that ascribed to DSCAM proteins of invertebrates. Although vertebrate DSCAMs lack the diversity of their invertebrate counterparts, the selective transcription of individual Pcdh isoforms can be achieved by promoter choice followed by alternative pre-mRNA cis-splicing thus increasing the number of possible combinations.

== Function ==
=== Homophilic interactions and intracellular signaling ===
Clustered Pcdhs proteins are detected throughout the neuronal soma, dendrites and axons and are observed in synapses and growth cones. Like classical cadherins, members of Pcdhs family were also shown to mediate cell-cell adhesion in cell-based assays and most of them showed to engage in homophilic trans-interactions. Schreiner and Weiner showed that Pcdhα and γ proteins can form multimeric complexes. If all three classes of Pcdhs could engage in multimerization of stochastically expressed Pcdhs isoforms, then neurons could produce a large number of distinct homophilic interaction units, amplifying significantly the cell-surface diversity more than the one afforded by stochastic gene expression alone.

As for cytoplasmic domain, all the three classes of clustered Pcdhs proteins are dissimilar, although they are strictly conserved in vertebrate evolution, suggesting a conserved cellular function. This is corroborated by a large number of other interacting proteins including phosphatases, kinases, adhesion molecules and synaptic proteins The cytoplasmic domain also mediates intracellular retention, a property which distinguishes the clustered protocadherins from the related classical cadherins. Furthermore, it was shown that Pcdhs are proteolytically processed by γ-secretase complex, which releases soluble intracellular fragments into the cytoplasm which might have a broad range of functions as acting locally in the cytoplasm and/or even regulate gene expression similarly to other cell-surface proteins such as Notch and N-cadherin. Since these molecules are involved in so many developmental processes like axon guidance and dendrite arborization, mutations in Pcdhs genes and their expression may play a role in Down, Rett as well as Fragile X syndrome, schizophrenia, and neurodegenerative diseases

The cytoplasmic domain of Pcdh-alpha can be divided into two specific types. Both of them enhance homophilic interactions. They associate with neurofillament M and fascin respectively.

== Human genes ==
- PCDH1
- PCDH7
- PCDH8
- PCDH9
- PCDH10
- PCDH11X/11Y
- PCDH12
- PCDH15
- PCDH17
- PCDH18
- PCDH19
- PCDH20
- PCDHA1
- PCDHA2
- PCDHA3
- PCDHA4
- PCDHA5
- PCDHA6
- PCDHA7
- PCDHA8
- PCDHA9
- PCDHA10
- PCDHA11
- PCDHA12
- PCDHA13
- PCDHAC1
- PCDHAC2
- PCDHB1
- PCDHB2
- PCDHB3
- PCDHB4
- PCDHB5
- PCDHB6
- PCDHB7
- PCDHB8
- PCDHB9
- PCDHB10
- PCDHB11
- PCDHB12
- PCDHB13
- PCDHB14
- PCDHB15
- PCDHB16
- PCDHB17
- PCDHB18
- PCDHGA1
- PCDHGA2
- PCDHGA3
- PCDHGA4
- PCDHGA5
- PCDHGA6
- PCDHGA7
- PCDHGA8
- PCDHGA9
- PCDHGA10
- PCDHGA11
- PCDHGA12
- PCDHGB1
- PCDHGB2
- PCDHGB3
- PCDHGB4
- PCDHGB5
- PCDHGB6
- PCDHGB7
- PCDHGC3
- PCDHGC4
- PCDHGC5
- FAT
- FAT2
- FAT4

== See also ==
- Cadherin
- PCDH11X
- Neuronal self-avoidance
- Epileptic Encephalopathy, Early Infantile, 9, caused by mutation in the gene encoding protocadherin-19
