= Language gene =

Language gene may refer to:

- FOXP2, a protein found in mammals
- PCDH11Y, a gene unique to human males
