= PCDHB5 =

Protein-coding gene in the species Homo sapiens

Identifiers
- Aliases: PCDHB5, PCDH-BETA5, protocadherin beta 5
- External IDs: OMIM: 606331; MGI: 2136745; GeneCards: PCDHB5

Gene location (Human)
Chr.	Chromosome 5 (human)
Band	5q31.3	Start	141,135,206 bp
Band	5q31.3	End	141,138,615 bp

Gene location (Mouse)
Chr.	Chromosome 18 (mouse)
Band	18|18 B3	Start	37,544,717 bp
Band	18|18 B3	End	37,547,567 bp
RNA expression pattern
Bgee	Human / Mouse (ortholog); Top expressed in: sperm; germinal epithelium; parietal pleura; islet of Langerhans; ganglionic eminence; visceral pleura; left ovary; right ovary; Brodmann area 23; ventricular zone / Top expressed in: Meckel's cartilage; humerus; embryo; dentate gyrus of hippocampal formation granule cell; neural layer of retina; cuneiform bones; scapula; superior frontal gyrus; primary visual cortex; fibula; More reference expression data
BioGPS	n/a
Gene ontology
Molecular function	calcium ion binding
Cellular component	integral component of membrane; plasma membrane; membrane; integral component of plasma membrane
Biological process	calcium-dependent cell-cell adhesion via plasma membrane cell adhesion molecules; synapse assembly; homophilic cell adhesion via plasma membrane adhesion molecules; chemical synaptic transmission; cell adhesion
Sources:Amigo / QuickGO
Orthologs
Databases	NCBI: entry; OMA: entry
Species	Human	Mouse
Entrez	26167	93881
Ensembl	ENSG00000113209	ENSMUSG00000045657
UniProt	Q9Y5E4	Q91VE5
RefSeq (mRNA)	NM_015669	NM_053135
RefSeq (protein)	NP_056484	NP_444365
Location (UCSC)	Chr 5: 141.14 – 141.14 Mb	Chr 18: 37.54 – 37.55 Mb
PubMed search
- Wikidata
View/Edit Human	View/Edit Mouse

Protocadherin beta-5 is a protein that in humans is encoded by the PCDHB5 gene.

This gene is a member of the protocadherin beta gene cluster, one of three related gene clusters tandemly linked on chromosome five. The gene clusters demonstrate an unusual genomic organization similar to that of B-cell and T-cell receptor gene clusters. The beta cluster contains 16 genes and 3 pseudogenes, each encoding 6 extracellular cadherin domains and a cytoplasmic tail that deviates from others in the cadherin superfamily. The extracellular domains interact in a homophilic manner to specify differential cell-cell connections. Unlike the alpha and gamma clusters, the transcripts from these genes are made up of only one large exon, not sharing common 3' exons as expected. These neural cadherin-like cell adhesion proteins are integral plasma membrane proteins. Their specific functions are unknown but they most likely play a critical role in the establishment and function of specific cell-cell neural connections.
