= PCDHB4 =

Protein-coding gene in the species Homo sapiens

Identifiers
- Aliases: PCDHB4, PCDH-BETA4, protocadherin beta 4
- External IDs: OMIM: 606330; MGI: 2136739; GeneCards: PCDHB4

Gene location (Human)
Chr.	Chromosome 5 (human)
Band	5q31.3	Start	141,121,818 bp
Band	5q31.3	End	141,125,623 bp

Gene location (Mouse)
Chr.	Chromosome 18 (mouse)
Band	18|18 B3	Start	37,453,434 bp
Band	18|18 B3	End	37,456,968 bp
RNA expression pattern
Bgee	Human / Mouse (ortholog); Top expressed in: testicle; Achilles tendon; C1 segment; islet of Langerhans; tibial arteries; Descending thoracic aorta; ascending aorta; prefrontal cortex; gastric mucosa; smooth muscle tissue / Top expressed in: embryo; dentate gyrus of hippocampal formation granule cell; primary visual cortex; superior frontal gyrus; neural layer of retina; cerebellar cortex; ganglionic eminence; genital tubercle; hippocampus proper; lens; More reference expression data
BioGPS	n/a
Gene ontology
Molecular function	calcium ion binding
Cellular component	integral component of membrane; integral component of plasma membrane; membrane; plasma membrane
Biological process	calcium-dependent cell-cell adhesion via plasma membrane cell adhesion molecules; synapse assembly; cell adhesion; nervous system development; homophilic cell adhesion via plasma membrane adhesion molecules; chemical synaptic transmission
Sources:Amigo / QuickGO
Orthologs
Databases	NCBI: entry; OMA: entry
Species	Human	Mouse
Entrez	56131	93876
Ensembl	ENSG00000081818	ENSMUSG00000063687
UniProt	Q9Y5E5	n/a
RefSeq (mRNA)	NM_018938	NM_053130
RefSeq (protein)	NP_061761	n/a
Location (UCSC)	Chr 5: 141.12 – 141.13 Mb	Chr 18: 37.45 – 37.46 Mb
PubMed search
- Wikidata
View/Edit Human	View/Edit Mouse

Protocadherin beta-4 is a protein that in humans is encoded by the PCDHB4 gene.

This gene is a member of the protocadherin beta gene cluster, one of three related gene clusters tandemly linked on chromosome five. The gene clusters demonstrate an unusual genomic organization similar to that of B-cell and T-cell receptor gene clusters. The beta cluster contains 16 genes and 3 pseudogenes, each encoding 6 extracellular cadherin domains and a cytoplasmic tail that deviates from others in the cadherin superfamily. The extracellular domains interact in a homophilic manner to specify differential cell-cell connections. Unlike the alpha and gamma clusters, the transcripts from these genes are made up of only one large exon, not sharing common 3' exons as expected. These neural cadherin-like cell adhesion proteins are integral plasma membrane proteins. Their specific functions are unknown but they most likely play a critical role in the establishment and function of specific cell-cell neural connections.
