= PCDHAC2 =

Protein-coding gene in the species Homo sapiens

Identifiers
- Aliases: PCDHAC2, PCDH-ALPHA-C2, protocadherin alpha subfamily C, 2
- External IDs: OMIM: 606321; MGI: 1891443; GeneCards: PCDHAC2

Gene location (Human)
Chr.	Chromosome 5 (human)
Band	5q31.3	Start	140,966,470 bp
Band	5q31.3	End	141,012,347 bp

Gene location (Mouse)
Chr.	Chromosome 18 (mouse)
Band	18|18 B3	Start	37,276,556 bp
Band	18|18 B3	End	37,320,710 bp
RNA expression pattern
Bgee	Human / Mouse (ortholog); Top expressed in: Brodmann area 9; prefrontal cortex; cerebellar hemisphere; right hemisphere of cerebellum; anterior cingulate cortex; islet of Langerhans; right frontal lobe; gonad; hypothalamus; testicle / Top expressed in: primary visual cortex; hippocampus proper; Cortex of frontal lobe; superior frontal gyrus; dentate gyrus of hippocampal formation granule cell; cerebellum; cerebellar cortex; genital tubercle; striatum of neuraxis; hypothalamus; More reference expression data
BioGPS	n/a
Gene ontology
Molecular function	calcium ion binding
Cellular component	integral component of membrane; plasma membrane; integral component of plasma membrane; membrane
Biological process	cell adhesion; homophilic cell adhesion via plasma membrane adhesion molecules; cell-cell signaling; nervous system development
Sources:Amigo / QuickGO
Orthologs
Databases	NCBI: entry; OMA: entry
Species	Human	Mouse
Entrez	56134	353237
Ensembl	ENSG00000243232	ENSMUSG00000102697
UniProt	Q9Y5I4	Q91Y09
RefSeq (mRNA)	NM_031883; NM_018899	NM_001003672
RefSeq (protein)	NP_061722; NP_114089	NP_001003672
Location (UCSC)	Chr 5: 140.97 – 141.01 Mb	Chr 18: 37.28 – 37.32 Mb
PubMed search
- Wikidata
View/Edit Human	View/Edit Mouse

Protocadherin alpha-C2 is a protein that in humans is encoded by the PCDHAC2 gene.

This gene is a member of the protocadherin alpha gene cluster, one of three related gene clusters tandemly linked on chromosome five that demonstrate an unusual genomic organization similar to that of B-cell and T-cell receptor gene clusters. The alpha gene cluster is composed of 15 cadherin superfamily genes related to the mouse CNR genes and consists of 13 highly similar and 2 more distantly related coding sequences. The tandem array of 15 N-terminal exons, or variable exons, are followed by downstream C-terminal exons, or constant exons, which are shared by all genes in the cluster. The large, uninterrupted N-terminal exons each encode six cadherin ectodomains while the C-terminal exons encode the cytoplasmic domain. These neural cadherin-like cell adhesion proteins are integral plasma membrane proteins that most likely play a critical role in the establishment and function of specific cell-cell connections in the brain. Alternative splicing has been observed and additional variants have been suggested but their full-length nature has yet to be determined.
