= PCDH11X =

Protein-coding gene in the species Homo sapiens

Identifiers
- Aliases: PCDH11X, PCDH-X, PCDH11, PCDHX, PPP1R119, protocadherin 11 X-linked, PCDH22, PCDH11Y, PCDH-Y
- External IDs: OMIM: 300246; MGI: 2442849; GeneCards: PCDH11X

Gene location (Human)
Chr.	X chromosome (human)
Band	Xq21.31	Start	91,779,261 bp
Band	Xq21.31	End	92,623,230 bp

Gene location (Mouse)
Chr.	X chromosome (mouse)
Band	X|X E2	Start	119,199,956 bp
Band	X|X E2	End	119,820,316 bp
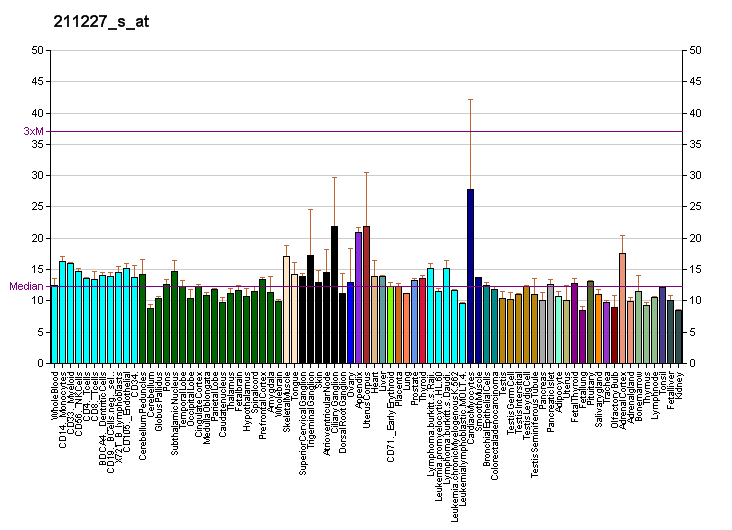

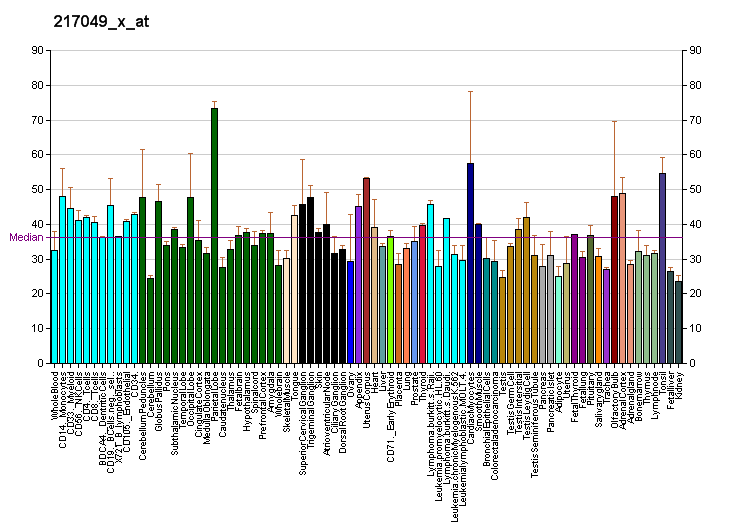
RNA expression pattern
Bgee	Human / Mouse (ortholog); Top expressed in: testicle; ganglionic eminence; ventricular zone; primary visual cortex; nucleus accumbens; Descending thoracic aorta; superior frontal gyrus; prefrontal cortex; ascending aorta; placenta / Top expressed in: lumbar subsegment of spinal cord; substantia nigra; anterior amygdaloid area; globus pallidus; lateral hypothalamus; piriform cortex; lateral septal nucleus; trigeminal ganglion; dorsomedial hypothalamic nucleus; paraventricular nucleus of hypothalamus; More reference expression data
BioGPS	More reference expression data
Gene ontology
Molecular function	calcium ion binding
Cellular component	integral component of membrane; plasma membrane; integral component of plasma membrane; membrane
Biological process	negative regulation of phosphatase activity; cell adhesion; homophilic cell adhesion via plasma membrane adhesion molecules
Sources:Amigo / QuickGO
Orthologs
Databases	NCBI: entry; OMA: entry
Species	Human	Mouse
Entrez	27328	245578
Ensembl	ENSG00000102290	ENSMUSG00000034755
UniProt	Q9BZA7	n/a
RefSeq (mRNA)	NM_001168360; NM_001168361; NM_001168362; NM_001168363; NM_014522 NM_032967; NM_032968; NM_032969	NM_001081385; NM_001271809; NM_001271810
RefSeq (protein)	NP_001161832; NP_001161833; NP_001161834; NP_001161835; NP_116750 NP_116751	n/a
Location (UCSC)	Chr X: 91.78 – 92.62 Mb	Chr X: 119.2 – 119.82 Mb
PubMed search
- Wikidata
View/Edit Human	View/Edit Mouse

Protocadherin 11 X-linked, also known as PCDH11X, is a protein which in humans is encoded by the PCDH11X gene.

== Function ==
This gene belongs to the protocadherin gene family, a subfamily of the cadherin superfamily. The encoded protein consists of an extracellular domain containing 7 cadherin repeats, a transmembrane domain and a cytoplasmic tail that differs from those of the classical cadherins. The gene is located in a major X/Y block of homology and its Y homolog (PCDH11Y), despite divergence leading to coding region changes, is the most closely related cadherin family member. The protein is thought to play a fundamental role in cell–cell recognition essential for the segmental development and function of the central nervous system. Neuronal self-avoidance is intricately linked to protocadherin activity. It also plays a role in structural cell-to-cell adherence. Transcripts arising from alternative splicing encode isoforms with variable cytoplasmic domains.

== Clinical significance ==
In a genome-wide association study, the PCDH11X gene has been linked as a risk factor in late onset Alzheimer's disease, but other studies on different populations could not confirm the initial association. The clinical significance of this gene is unclear, and the gene might play different roles in different population specific contexts.
