= PCDHA9 =

Protein-coding gene in the species Homo sapiens

Identifiers
- Aliases: PCDHA9, PCDH-ALPHA9, protocadherin alpha 9
- External IDs: OMIM: 606315; MGI: 2681879; GeneCards: PCDHA9

Gene location (Human)
Chr.	Chromosome 5 (human)
Band	5q31.3	Start	140,847,772 bp
Band	5q31.3	End	141,012,347 bp

Gene location (Mouse)
Chr.	Chromosome 18 (mouse)
Band	18|18 B2- B3	Start	37,125,424 bp
Band	18|18 B2- B3	End	37,320,710 bp
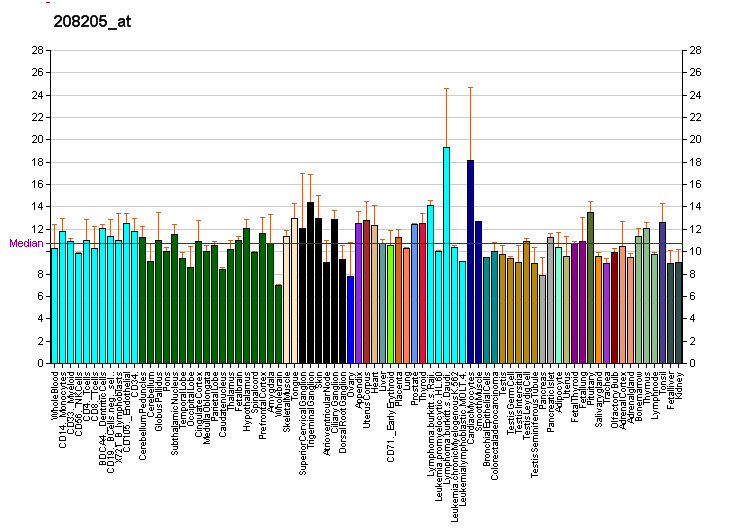
RNA expression pattern
Bgee	Human / Mouse (ortholog); Top expressed in: buccal mucosa cell; optic nerve; sperm; Brodmann area 46; postcentral gyrus; lateral nuclear group of thalamus; cerebellar vermis; superior frontal gyrus; lower lobe of lung; ganglionic eminence / Top expressed in: striatum of neuraxis; neural tube; olfactory bulb; cerebellum; mesencephalon; hypothalamus; cerebellar cortex; superior frontal gyrus; hippocampus proper; primary visual cortex; More reference expression data
BioGPS	More reference expression data
Gene ontology
Molecular function	calcium ion binding
Cellular component	integral component of membrane; plasma membrane; membrane; integral component of plasma membrane
Biological process	homophilic cell adhesion via plasma membrane adhesion molecules; cell adhesion; cell-cell signaling; nervous system development
Sources:Amigo / QuickGO
Orthologs
Databases	NCBI: entry; OMA: entry
Species	Human	Mouse
Entrez	9752	353235
Ensembl	ENSG00000204961	ENSMUSG00000103800
UniProt	Q9Y5H5	Q91Y12
RefSeq (mRNA)	NM_031857; NM_014005	NM_201243
RefSeq (protein)	NP_054724; NP_114063	NP_957695
Location (UCSC)	Chr 5: 140.85 – 141.01 Mb	Chr 18: 37.13 – 37.32 Mb
PubMed search
- Wikidata
View/Edit Human	View/Edit Mouse

Protocadherin alpha-9 is a protein that in humans is encoded by the PCDHA9 gene.

This gene is a member of the protocadherin alpha gene cluster, one of three related gene clusters tandemly linked on chromosome 5 that demonstrate an unusual genomic organization similar to that of B-cell and T-cell receptor gene clusters. The alpha gene cluster is composed of 15 cadherin superfamily genes related to the mouse CNR genes and consists of 13 highly similar and 2 more distantly related coding sequences. The tandem array of 15 N-terminal exons, or variable exons, are followed by downstream C-terminal exons, or constant exons, which are shared by all genes in the cluster. The large, uninterrupted N-terminal exons each encode six cadherin ectodomains while the C-terminal exons encode the cytoplasmic domain. These neural cadherin-like cell adhesion proteins are integral plasma membrane proteins that most likely play a critical role in the establishment and function of specific cell-cell connections in the brain. Alternative splicing has been observed and additional variants have been suggested but their full-length nature has yet to be determined.
