= PCDH8 =

Protein-coding gene in the species Homo sapiens

Identifiers
- Aliases: PCDH8, ARCADLIN, PAPC, protocadherin 8
- External IDs: OMIM: 603580; MGI: 1306800; GeneCards: PCDH8

Gene location (Human)
Chr.	Chromosome 13 (human)
Band	13q14.3	Start	52,842,889 bp
Band	13q14.3	End	52,848,641 bp

Gene location (Mouse)
Chr.	Chromosome 14 (mouse)
Band	14 D3|14 42.76 cM	Start	80,004,215 bp
Band	14 D3|14 42.76 cM	End	80,008,752 bp
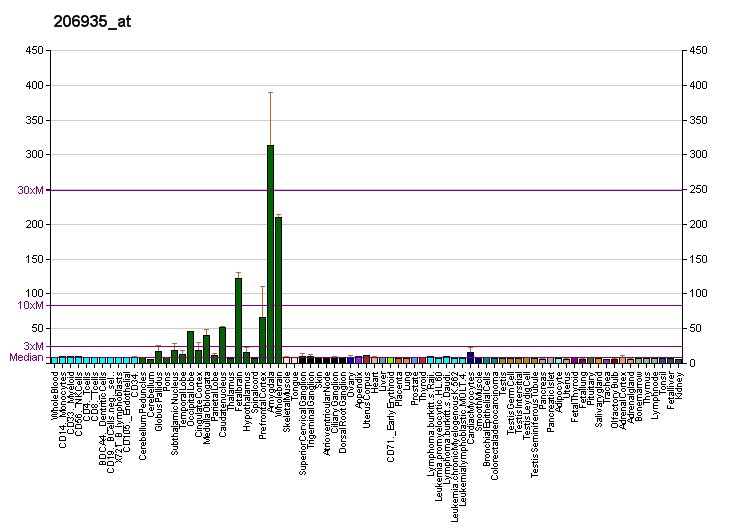
RNA expression pattern
Bgee	Human / Mouse (ortholog); Top expressed in: Brodmann area 23; frontal pole; endothelial cell; middle temporal gyrus; Brodmann area 10; dorsolateral prefrontal cortex; primary visual cortex; Brodmann area 9; superior frontal gyrus; nucleus accumbens / Top expressed in: anterior amygdaloid area; lateral septal nucleus; substantia nigra; subiculum; Region I of hippocampus proper; superior colliculus; dorsomedial hypothalamic nucleus; ventral tegmental area; paraventricular nucleus of hypothalamus; lateral hypothalamus; More reference expression data
BioGPS	More reference expression data
Gene ontology
Molecular function	calcium ion binding
Cellular component	cell projection; cell junction; postsynaptic membrane; plasma membrane; membrane; presynaptic membrane; integral component of membrane; synapse; dendrite; integral component of plasma membrane; glutamatergic synapse; integral component of postsynaptic membrane
Biological process	morphogenesis of embryonic epithelium; somitogenesis; chemical synaptic transmission; homophilic cell adhesion via plasma membrane adhesion molecules; cell-cell signaling; cell adhesion; nervous system development; regulation of synaptic membrane adhesion
Sources:Amigo / QuickGO
Orthologs
Databases	NCBI: entry; OMA: entry
Species	Human	Mouse
Entrez	5100	18530
Ensembl	ENSG00000136099	ENSMUSG00000036422
UniProt	O95206	Q7TSK3
RefSeq (mRNA)	NM_032949; NM_002590	NM_001042726; NM_021543
RefSeq (protein)	NP_002581; NP_116567	NP_001036191; NP_067518
Location (UCSC)	Chr 13: 52.84 – 52.85 Mb	Chr 14: 80 – 80.01 Mb
PubMed search
- Wikidata
View/Edit Human	View/Edit Mouse

Protocadherin-8 is a protein that in humans is encoded by the PCDH8 gene.

This gene belongs to the protocadherin gene family, a subfamily of the cadherin superfamily. The gene encodes an integral membrane protein that is thought to function in cell adhesion in a CNS-specific manner. Unlike classical cadherins, which are generally encoded by 15-17 exons, this gene includes only 3 exons. Notable is the large first exon encoding the extracellular region, including 6 cadherin domains and a transmembrane region. Alternative splicing yields isoforms with unique cytoplasmic tails.
