= PCDH12 =

Protein-coding gene in the species Homo sapiens

Identifiers
- Aliases: PCDH12, VE-cadherin-2, VECAD2, protocadherin 12, DMJDS1
- External IDs: OMIM: 605622; MGI: 1855700; GeneCards: PCDH12

Gene location (Human)
Chr.	Chromosome 5 (human)
Band	5q31.3	Start	141,943,581 bp
Band	5q31.3	End	141,969,741 bp

Gene location (Mouse)
Chr.	Chromosome 18 (mouse)
Band	18|18 B3	Start	38,400,142 bp
Band	18|18 B3	End	38,417,455 bp
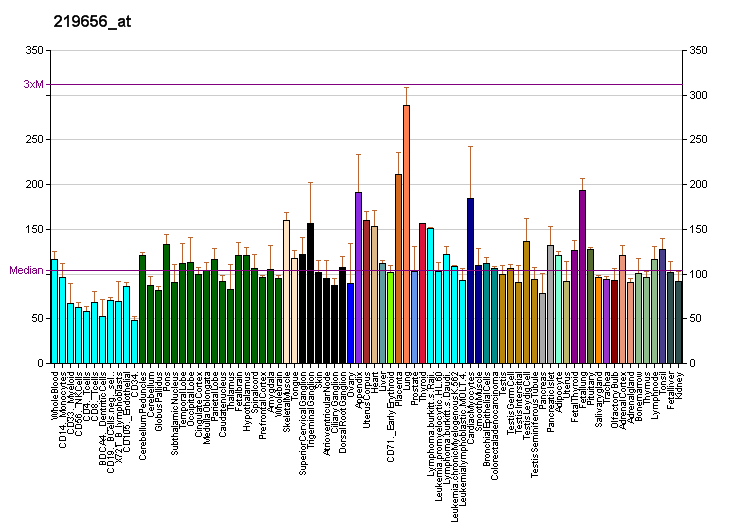
RNA expression pattern
Bgee	Human / Mouse (ortholog); Top expressed in: tendon of biceps brachii; placenta; right lung; apex of heart; vena cava; spleen; upper lobe of lung; upper lobe of left lung; lateral nuclear group of thalamus; cardia / Top expressed in: left lung lobe; renal corpuscle; decidua; right lung lobe; endothelial cell of lymphatic vessel; dermis; embryo; spermatocyte; digastric muscle; body of femur; More reference expression data
BioGPS	More reference expression data
Gene ontology
Molecular function	calcium ion binding
Cellular component	integral component of membrane; cell junction; plasma membrane; integral component of plasma membrane; extracellular exosome; membrane; cell-cell junction; extracellular region
Biological process	glycogen metabolic process; calcium-dependent cell-cell adhesion via plasma membrane cell adhesion molecules; labyrinthine layer development; neuron recognition; homophilic cell adhesion via plasma membrane adhesion molecules; cell adhesion; cell-cell signaling
Sources:Amigo / QuickGO
Orthologs
Databases	NCBI: entry; OMA: entry
Species	Human	Mouse
Entrez	51294	53601
Ensembl	ENSG00000113555	ENSMUSG00000024440
UniProt	Q9NPG4	O55134
RefSeq (mRNA)	NM_016580	NM_017378
RefSeq (protein)	NP_057664	NP_059074
Location (UCSC)	Chr 5: 141.94 – 141.97 Mb	Chr 18: 38.4 – 38.42 Mb
PubMed search
- Wikidata
View/Edit Human	View/Edit Mouse

Protocadherin-12 is a protein that in humans is encoded by the PCDH12 gene.

This gene belongs to the protocadherin gene family, a subfamily of the cadherin superfamily. The encoded protein consists of an extracellular domain containing 6 cadherin repeats, a transmembrane domain and a cytoplasmic tail that differs from those of the classical cadherins. The gene localizes to the region on chromosome 5 where the protocadherin gene clusters reside. The exon organization of this transcript is similar to that of the gene cluster transcripts, notably the first large exon, but no significant sequence homology exists. The function of this cellular adhesion protein is undetermined but mouse protocadherin 12 does not bind catenins and appears to have no effect on cell migration or growth.
