= PCDHB14 =

Protein-coding gene in the species Homo sapiens

Identifiers
- Aliases: PCDHB14, PCDH-BETA14, protocadherin beta 14
- External IDs: OMIM: 606340; MGI: 2136758; GeneCards: PCDHB14
Available structures
PDB	Ortholog search: PDBe RCSB
PDB	List of PDB id codes 1WYJ

Gene location (Human)
Chr.	Chromosome 5 (human)
Band	5q31.3	Start	141,223,343 bp
Band	5q31.3	End	141,227,759 bp

Gene location (Mouse)
Chr.	Chromosome 18 (mouse)
Band	18|18 B3	Start	37,637,317 bp
Band	18|18 B3	End	37,640,875 bp
RNA expression pattern
Bgee	Human / Mouse (ortholog); Top expressed in: ganglionic eminence; Descending thoracic aorta; lactiferous duct; ascending aorta; Achilles tendon; apex of heart; prefrontal cortex; endothelial cell; body of uterus; tibial arteries / Top expressed in: cerebellar cortex; superior frontal gyrus; embryo; neural layer of retina; primary visual cortex; hippocampus proper; dentate gyrus of hippocampal formation granule cell; ganglionic eminence; neural tube; mesencephalon; More reference expression data
BioGPS	n/a
Gene ontology
Molecular function	calcium ion binding; protein binding
Cellular component	plasma membrane; membrane; integral component of membrane; integral component of plasma membrane
Biological process	chemical synaptic transmission; homophilic cell adhesion via plasma membrane adhesion molecules; synapse assembly; calcium-dependent cell-cell adhesion via plasma membrane cell adhesion molecules; cell adhesion
Sources:Amigo / QuickGO
Orthologs
Databases	NCBI: entry; OMA: entry
Species	Human	Mouse
Entrez	56122	93891
Ensembl	ENSG00000120327	ENSMUSG00000046191
UniProt	Q9Y5E9	Q91XZ9
RefSeq (mRNA)	NM_018934	NM_053145
RefSeq (protein)	NP_061757	NP_444375
Location (UCSC)	Chr 5: 141.22 – 141.23 Mb	Chr 18: 37.64 – 37.64 Mb
PubMed search
- Wikidata
View/Edit Human	View/Edit Mouse

Protocadherin beta-14 is a protein that in humans is encoded by the PCDHB14 gene.

This gene is a member of the protocadherin beta gene cluster, one of three related gene clusters tandemly linked on chromosome 5. The gene clusters demonstrate an unusual genomic organization similar to that of B-cell and T-cell receptor gene clusters.

The beta cluster contains 16 genes and 3 pseudogenes, each encoding 6 extracellular cadherin domains and a cytoplasmic tail that deviates from others in the cadherin superfamily. The extracellular domains interact in a homophilic manner to specify differential cell-cell connections.

Unlike the alpha and gamma clusters, the transcripts from these genes are made up of only one large exon, not sharing common 3' exons as expected. These neural cadherin-like cell adhesion proteins are integral plasma membrane proteins. Their specific functions are unknown but they most likely play a critical role in the establishment and function of specific cell-cell neural connections.
