= PCDHB15 =

Protein-coding gene in the species Homo sapiens

Identifiers
- Aliases: PCDHB15, PCDH-BETA15, protocadherin beta 15
- External IDs: OMIM: 606341; MGI: 2136760; GeneCards: PCDHB15

Gene location (Human)
Chr.	Chromosome 5 (human)
Band	5q31.3	Start	141,245,395 bp
Band	5q31.3	End	141,249,365 bp

Gene location (Mouse)
Chr.	Chromosome 18 (mouse)
Band	18|18 B3	Start	37,650,924 bp
Band	18|18 B3	End	37,657,532 bp
RNA expression pattern
Bgee	Human / Mouse (ortholog); Top expressed in: ganglionic eminence; Descending thoracic aorta; left ovary; body of uterus; ascending aorta; right ovary; smooth muscle tissue; left uterine tube; left coronary artery; ventricular zone / Top expressed in: semi-lunar valve; aortic valve; epithelium of lens; trigeminal ganglion; ascending aorta; ciliary body; calvaria; iris; vas deferens; substantia nigra; More reference expression data
BioGPS	n/a
Gene ontology
Molecular function	calcium ion binding
Cellular component	integral component of plasma membrane; membrane; integral component of membrane; plasma membrane; photoreceptor connecting cilium
Biological process	nervous system development; homophilic cell adhesion via plasma membrane adhesion molecules; cell adhesion; chemical synaptic transmission; synapse assembly
Sources:Amigo / QuickGO
Orthologs
Databases	NCBI: entry; OMA: entry
Species	Human	Mouse
Entrez	56121	93893
Ensembl	ENSG00000113248	ENSMUSG00000073591
UniProt	Q9Y5E8	n/a
RefSeq (mRNA)	NM_018935	NM_053147
RefSeq (protein)	NP_061758	n/a
Location (UCSC)	Chr 5: 141.25 – 141.25 Mb	Chr 18: 37.65 – 37.66 Mb
PubMed search
- Wikidata
View/Edit Human	View/Edit Mouse

Protocadherin beta-15 is a protein that in humans is encoded by the PCDHB15 gene.

This gene is a member of the protocadherin beta gene cluster, one of three related gene clusters tandemly linked on chromosome five. The gene clusters demonstrate an unusual genomic organization similar to that of B-cell and T-cell receptor gene clusters. The beta cluster contains 16 genes and 3 pseudogenes, each encoding 6 extracellular cadherin domains and a cytoplasmic tail that deviates from others in the cadherin superfamily. The extracellular domains interact in a homophilic manner to specify differential cell-cell connections. Unlike the alpha and gamma clusters, the transcripts from these genes are made up of only one large exon, not sharing common 3' exons as expected. These neural cadherin-like cell adhesion proteins are integral plasma membrane proteins. Their specific functions are unknown but they most likely play a critical role in the establishment and function of specific cell-cell neural connections.
