= PCDH1 =

Protein-coding gene in the species Homo sapiens

Identifiers
- Aliases: PCDH1, PC42, PCDH42, protocadherin 1
- External IDs: OMIM: 603626; MGI: 104692; GeneCards: PCDH1

Gene location (Human)
Chr.	Chromosome 5 (human)
Band	5q31.3	Start	141,853,090 bp
Band	5q31.3	End	141,879,246 bp

Gene location (Mouse)
Chr.	Chromosome 18 (mouse)
Band	18 B3|18 20.08 cM	Start	38,318,967 bp
Band	18 B3|18 20.08 cM	End	38,345,106 bp
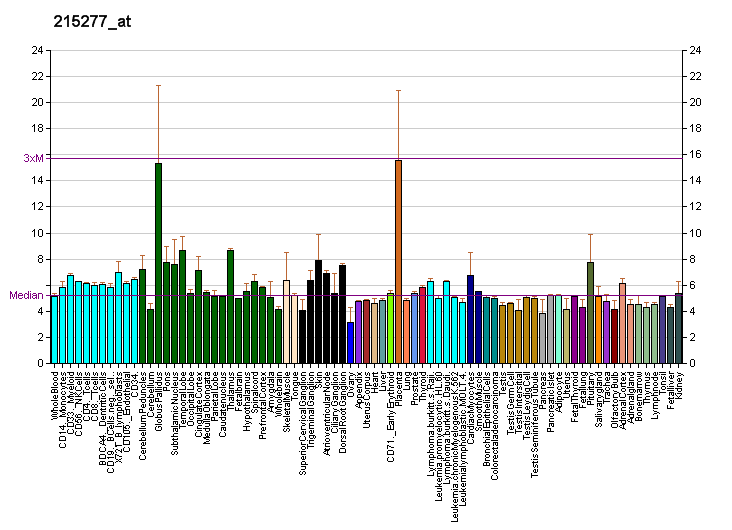
RNA expression pattern
Bgee	Human / Mouse (ortholog); Top expressed in: mucosa of pharynx; beta cell; mucosa of transverse colon; right lung; minor salivary glands; skin of arm; apex of heart; upper lobe of left lung; skin of leg; olfactory zone of nasal mucosa / Top expressed in: dentate gyrus of hippocampal formation granule cell; superior frontal gyrus; esophagus; lip; primary visual cortex; yolk sac; genital tubercle; tail of embryo; intestinal villus; epithelium of small intestine; More reference expression data
BioGPS	More reference expression data
Gene ontology
Molecular function	calcium ion binding
Cellular component	integral component of membrane; plasma membrane; integral component of plasma membrane; membrane; cell-cell junction; nucleus; nucleolus; cell junction; intracellular membrane-bounded organelle
Biological process	cell-cell signaling; cell adhesion; nervous system development; homophilic cell adhesion via plasma membrane adhesion molecules
Sources:Amigo / QuickGO
Orthologs
Databases	NCBI: entry; OMA: entry
Species	Human	Mouse
Entrez	5097	75599
Ensembl	ENSG00000156453	ENSMUSG00000051375
UniProt	Q08174	n/a
RefSeq (mRNA)	NM_001278613; NM_001278615; NM_002587; NM_032420	NM_029357
RefSeq (protein)	NP_001265542; NP_001265544; NP_002578; NP_115796	n/a
Location (UCSC)	Chr 5: 141.85 – 141.88 Mb	Chr 18: 38.32 – 38.35 Mb
PubMed search
- Wikidata
View/Edit Human	View/Edit Mouse

Protocadherin-1 is a protein that in humans is encoded by the PCDH1 gene.

This gene belongs to the protocadherin subfamily within the cadherin superfamily. The encoded protein is a membrane protein found at cell-cell boundaries. It is involved in neural cell adhesion, suggesting a possible role in neuronal development. The protein includes an extracellular region, containing 7 cadherin-like domains, a transmembrane region and a C-terminal cytoplasmic region. Cells expressing the protein showed cell aggregation activity. Alternative splicing occurs in this gene.
