= PCDHGB7 =

Protein-coding gene in the species Homo sapiens

Identifiers
- Aliases: PCDHGB7, ME6, PCDH-GAMMA-B7, protocadherin gamma subfamily B, 7
- External IDs: OMIM: 606304; MGI: 1935199; GeneCards: PCDHGB7

Gene location (Human)
Chr.	Chromosome 5 (human)
Band	5q31.3	Start	141,417,645 bp
Band	5q31.3	End	141,512,975 bp

Gene location (Mouse)
Chr.	Chromosome 18 (mouse)
Band	18|18 B3	Start	37,884,653 bp
Band	18|18 B3	End	37,974,926 bp
RNA expression pattern
Bgee	Human / Mouse (ortholog); Top expressed in: stromal cell of endometrium; ganglionic eminence; Achilles tendon; ventricular zone; right lung; right coronary artery; gastric mucosa; smooth muscle tissue; sural nerve; Descending thoracic aorta / Top expressed in: ganglionic eminence; striatum of neuraxis; cerebellum; cerebellar cortex; olfactory bulb; neural tube; mesencephalon; genital tubercle; hypothalamus; tail of embryo; More reference expression data
BioGPS	n/a
Gene ontology
Molecular function	calcium ion binding
Cellular component	integral component of membrane; plasma membrane; membrane; integral component of plasma membrane
Biological process	homophilic cell adhesion via plasma membrane adhesion molecules; cell adhesion; cell-cell signaling; nervous system development
Sources:Amigo / QuickGO
Orthologs
Databases	NCBI: entry; OMA: entry
Species	Human	Mouse
Entrez	56099	93704
Ensembl	ENSG00000254122	ENSMUSG00000104063
UniProt	Q9Y5F8	Q91XX3
RefSeq (mRNA)	NM_032101; NM_018927	NM_033579
RefSeq (protein)	NP_061750; NP_115272	NP_291057
Location (UCSC)	Chr 5: 141.42 – 141.51 Mb	Chr 18: 37.88 – 37.97 Mb
PubMed search
- Wikidata
View/Edit Human	View/Edit Mouse

Protocadherin gamma-B7 is a protein that in humans is encoded by the PCDHGB7 gene.

This gene is a member of the protocadherin gamma gene cluster, one of three related clusters tandemly linked on chromosome five. These gene clusters have an immunoglobulin-like organization, suggesting that a novel mechanism may be involved in their regulation and expression. The gamma gene cluster includes 22 genes divided into 3 subfamilies. Subfamily A contains 12 genes, subfamily B contains 7 genes and 2 pseudogenes, and the more distantly related subfamily C contains 3 genes. The tandem array of 22 large, variable region exons are followed by a constant region, containing 3 exons shared by all genes in the cluster. Each variable region exon encodes the extracellular region, which includes 6 cadherin ectodomains and a transmembrane region. The constant region exons encode the common cytoplasmic region. These neural cadherin-like cell adhesion proteins most likely play a critical role in the establishment and function of specific cell-cell connections in the brain. Alternative splicing has been described for the gamma cluster genes.
