= PCDHB13 =

Protein-coding gene in the species Homo sapiens

Identifiers
- Aliases: PCDHB13, PCDH-BETA13, protocadherin beta 13
- External IDs: OMIM: 606339; GeneCards: PCDHB13

Gene location (Human)
Chr.	Chromosome 5 (human)
Band	5q31.3	Start	141,213,919 bp
Band	5q31.3	End	141,218,979 bp
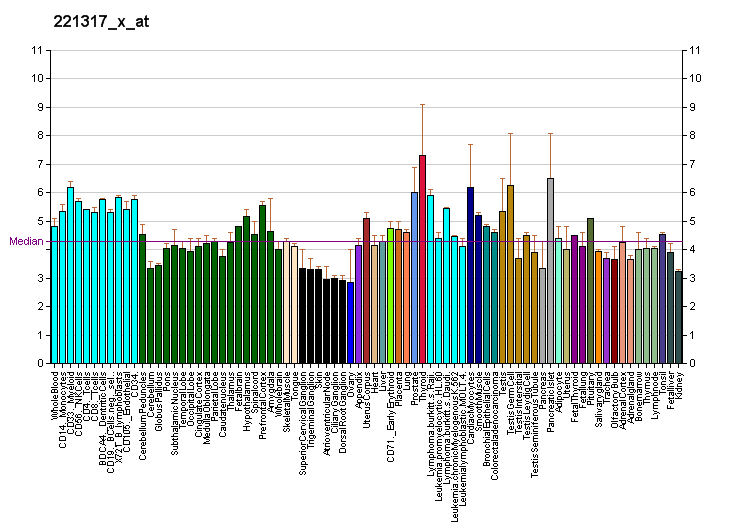
RNA expression pattern
Bgee	Human / Mouse (ortholog); Top expressed in: gonad; buccal mucosa cell; tendon; testicle; right ventricle; decidua; stromal cell of endometrium; ganglionic eminence; islet of Langerhans; corpus epididymis / n/a; More reference expression data
BioGPS	More reference expression data
Gene ontology
Molecular function	calcium ion binding
Cellular component	plasma membrane; membrane; integral component of membrane; integral component of plasma membrane; photoreceptor connecting cilium; synapse; postsynaptic membrane; photoreceptor disc membrane
Biological process	chemical synaptic transmission; homophilic cell adhesion via plasma membrane adhesion molecules; synapse assembly; calcium-dependent cell-cell adhesion via plasma membrane cell adhesion molecules; cell adhesion
Sources:Amigo / QuickGO
Orthologs
Databases	NCBI: entry; OMA: entry
Species	Human	Mouse
Entrez	56123	n/a
Ensembl	ENSG00000187372	n/a
UniProt	Q9Y5F0	n/a
RefSeq (mRNA)	NM_018933	n/a
RefSeq (protein)	NP_061756	n/a
Location (UCSC)	Chr 5: 141.21 – 141.22 Mb	n/a
PubMed search		n/a
- Wikidata
View/Edit Human

Protocadherin beta-13 is a protein that in humans is encoded by the PCDHB13 gene.

== Function ==
This gene is a member of the protocadherin beta gene cluster, one of three related gene clusters tandemly linked on chromosome five. The gene clusters demonstrate an unusual genomic organization similar to that of B-cell and T-cell receptor gene clusters. The beta cluster contains 16 genes and 3 pseudogenes, each encoding 6 extracellular cadherin domains and a cytoplasmic tail that deviates from others in the cadherin superfamily. The extracellular domains interact in a homophilic manner to specify differential cell-cell connections. Unlike the alpha and gamma clusters, the transcripts from these genes are made up of only one large exon, not sharing common 3' exons as expected. These neural cadherin-like cell adhesion proteins are integral plasma membrane proteins. Their specific functions are unknown but they most likely play a critical role in the establishment and function of specific cell-cell neural connections.
