= PCDH10 =

Protein-coding gene in the species Homo sapiens

Identifiers
- Aliases: PCDH10, OL-PCDH, PCDH19, protocadherin 10
- External IDs: OMIM: 608286; MGI: 1338042; GeneCards: PCDH10

Gene location (Human)
Chr.	Chromosome 4 (human)
Band	4q28.3	Start	133,149,294 bp
Band	4q28.3	End	133,208,606 bp

Gene location (Mouse)
Chr.	Chromosome 3 (mouse)
Band	3|3 B	Start	45,332,833 bp
Band	3|3 B	End	45,390,058 bp
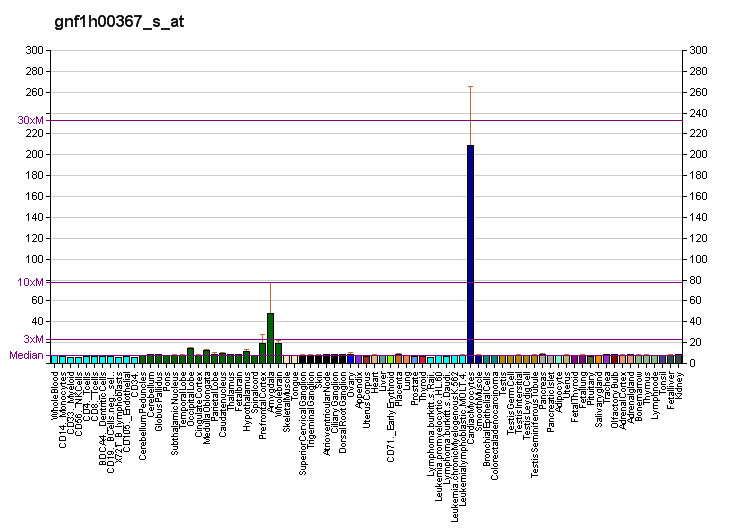

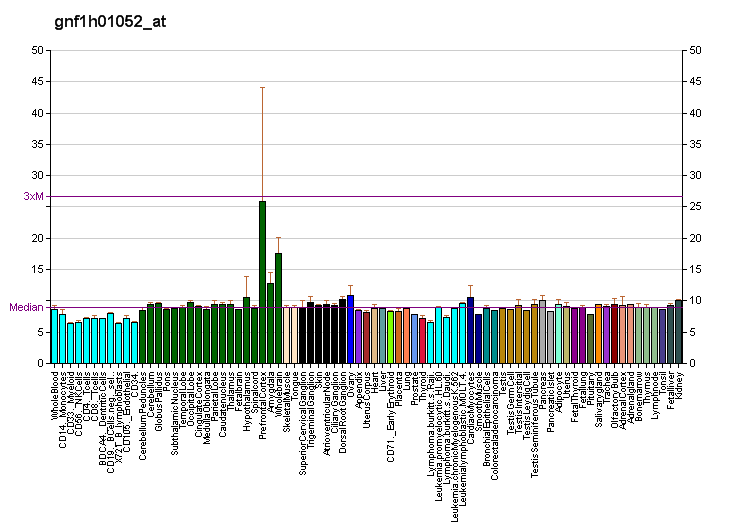
RNA expression pattern
Bgee	Human / Mouse (ortholog); Top expressed in: endothelial cell; prefrontal cortex; internal globus pallidus; Brodmann area 46; caudate nucleus; nucleus accumbens; superior frontal gyrus; Brodmann area 23; stromal cell of endometrium; putamen / Top expressed in: substantia nigra; olfactory tubercle; lateral hypothalamus; globus pallidus; dorsomedial hypothalamic nucleus; primary motor cortex; superior frontal gyrus; paraventricular nucleus of hypothalamus; nucleus accumbens; medial dorsal nucleus; More reference expression data
BioGPS	More reference expression data
Gene ontology
Molecular function	calcium ion binding
Cellular component	integral component of membrane; plasma membrane; membrane; integral component of plasma membrane
Biological process	homophilic cell adhesion via plasma membrane adhesion molecules; cell adhesion; cell-cell signaling; nervous system development
Sources:Amigo / QuickGO
Orthologs
Databases	NCBI: entry; OMA: entry
Species	Human	Mouse
Entrez	57575	18526
Ensembl	ENSG00000138650	ENSMUSG00000049100
UniProt	Q9P2E7	n/a
RefSeq (mRNA)	NM_020815; NM_032961	NM_001098170; NM_001098171; NM_001098172; NM_011043
RefSeq (protein)	NP_065866; NP_116586	n/a
Location (UCSC)	Chr 4: 133.15 – 133.21 Mb	Chr 3: 45.33 – 45.39 Mb
PubMed search
- Wikidata
View/Edit Human	View/Edit Mouse

Protocadherin-10 is a protein that in humans is encoded by the PCDH10 gene.

This gene belongs to the protocadherin gene family, a subfamily of the cadherin superfamily. The mRNA encodes a cadherin-related neuronal receptor thought to play a role in the establishment and function of specific cell-cell connections in the brain. This family member contains 6 extracellular cadherin domains, a transmembrane domain, and a cytoplasmic tail differing from those of the classical cadherins. Alternatively spliced transcripts encode isoforms with unique cytoplasmic domains.
