= PCDHB10 =

Protein-coding gene in the species Homo sapiens

Identifiers
- Aliases: PCDHB10, PCDH-BETA10, PCHB10, protocadherin beta 10
- External IDs: OMIM: 606336; MGI: 2136756; GeneCards: PCDHB10

Gene location (Human)
Chr.	Chromosome 5 (human)
Band	5q31.3	Start	141,192,353 bp
Band	5q31.3	End	141,195,647 bp

Gene location (Mouse)
Chr.	Chromosome 18 (mouse)
Band	18|18 B3	Start	37,622,518 bp
Band	18|18 B3	End	37,627,558 bp
RNA expression pattern
Bgee	Human / Mouse (ortholog); Top expressed in: ganglionic eminence; endothelial cell; Descending thoracic aorta; Achilles tendon; Brodmann area 46; ascending aorta; smooth muscle tissue; prefrontal cortex; right coronary artery; popliteal artery / Top expressed in: dentate gyrus of hippocampal formation granule cell; neural layer of retina; superior frontal gyrus; primary visual cortex; cerebellar cortex; esophagus; lens; genital tubercle; neural tube; ganglionic eminence; More reference expression data
BioGPS	n/a
Gene ontology
Molecular function	calcium ion binding
Cellular component	integral component of membrane; plasma membrane; membrane; integral component of plasma membrane
Biological process	calcium-dependent cell-cell adhesion via plasma membrane cell adhesion molecules; synapse assembly; homophilic cell adhesion via plasma membrane adhesion molecules; chemical synaptic transmission; cell adhesion
Sources:Amigo / QuickGO
Orthologs
Databases	NCBI: entry; OMA: entry
Species	Human	Mouse
Entrez	56126	93889
Ensembl	ENSG00000120324	ENSMUSG00000048347
UniProt	Q9UN67	Q91Y02
RefSeq (mRNA)	NM_018930	NM_053143
RefSeq (protein)	NP_061753	NP_444373
Location (UCSC)	Chr 5: 141.19 – 141.2 Mb	Chr 18: 37.62 – 37.63 Mb
PubMed search
- Wikidata
View/Edit Human	View/Edit Mouse

Protocadherin beta-10 is a protein that in humans is encoded by the PCDHB10 gene.

This gene is a member of the protocadherin beta gene cluster, one of three related gene clusters tandemly linked on chromosome five. The gene clusters demonstrate an unusual genomic organization similar to that of B-cell and T-cell receptor gene clusters. The beta cluster contains 16 genes and 3 pseudogenes, each encoding 6 extracellular cadherin domains and a cytoplasmic tail that deviates from others in the cadherin superfamily. The extracellular domains interact in a homophilic manner to specify differential cell-cell connections. Unlike the alpha and gamma clusters, the transcripts from these genes are made up of only one large exon, not sharing common 3' exons as expected. These neural cadherin-like cell adhesion proteins are integral plasma membrane proteins. Their specific functions are unknown but they most likely play a critical role in the establishment and function of specific cell-cell neural connections.
