= PCDHB11 =

Protein-coding gene in the species Homo sapiens

Identifiers
- Aliases: PCDHB11, ME2, PCDH-BETA11, protocadherin beta 11
- External IDs: OMIM: 606337; MGI: 2136759; GeneCards: PCDHB11

Gene location (Human)
| Chr. | Chromosome 5 (human) |
| Band | 5q31.3 | Start | 141,199,610 bp |
| Band | 5q31.3 | End | 141,203,779 bp |

Gene location (Mouse)
| Chr. | Chromosome 18 (mouse) |
| Band | 18|18 B3 | Start | 37,646,674 bp |
| Band | 18|18 B3 | End | 37,651,378 bp |
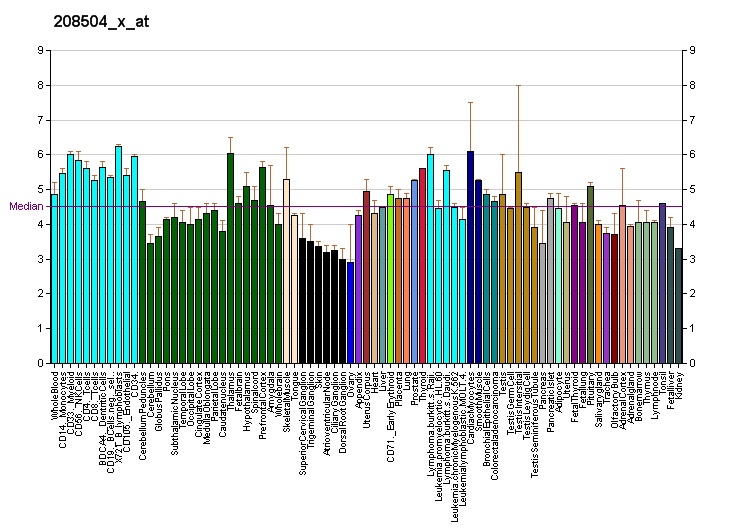
RNA expression pattern
| Bgee | Human / Mouse (ortholog); Top expressed in: Achilles tendon; Descending thoracic aorta; ascending aorta; popliteal artery; tibial arteries; sural nerve; ganglionic eminence; islet of Langerhans; gastric mucosa; right coronary artery / Top expressed in: Rostral migratory stream; internal carotid artery; external carotid artery; iris; ciliary body; superior cervical ganglion; retinal pigment epithelium; dorsal striatum; vas deferens; nucleus of stria terminalis; More reference expression data |
| BioGPS | More reference expression data |
Gene ontology
| Molecular function | calcium ion binding |
| Cellular component | integral component of membrane; plasma membrane; integral component of plasma membrane; membrane |
| Biological process | calcium-dependent cell-cell adhesion via plasma membrane cell adhesion molecules; synapse assembly; cell adhesion; nervous system development; homophilic cell adhesion via plasma membrane adhesion molecules; chemical synaptic transmission |
Sources:Amigo / QuickGO
Orthologs
| Databases | NCBI: entry; OMA: entry |
| Species | Human | Mouse |
| Entrez | 56125 | 93892 |
| Ensembl | ENSG00000197479 | ENSMUSG00000044022 |
| UniProt | Q9Y5F2 | Q91V48 |
| RefSeq (mRNA) | NM_018931 | NM_053146 |
| RefSeq (protein) | NP_061754 | NP_444376 |
| Location (UCSC) | Chr 5: 141.2 – 141.2 Mb | Chr 18: 37.65 – 37.65 Mb |
| PubMed search |
- Wikidata
| View/Edit Human | View/Edit Mouse |

Protocadherin beta-11 is a protein that in humans is encoded by the PCDHB11 gene.

This gene is a member of the protocadherin beta gene cluster, one of three related gene clusters tandemly linked on chromosome five. The gene clusters demonstrate an unusual genomic organization similar to that of B-cell and T-cell receptor gene clusters. The beta cluster contains 16 genes and 3 pseudogenes, each encoding 6 extracellular cadherin domains and a cytoplasmic tail that deviates from others in the cadherin superfamily. The extracellular domains interact in a homophilic manner to specify differential cell-cell connections. Unlike the alpha and gamma clusters, the transcripts from these genes are made up of only one large exon, not sharing common 3' exons as expected. These neural cadherin-like cell adhesion proteins are integral plasma membrane proteins. Their specific functions are unknown but they most likely play a critical role in the establishment and function of specific cell-cell neural connections.
