= PCDHB12 =

Protein-coding gene in humans

Identifiers
- Aliases: PCDHB12, PCDH-BETA12, protocadherin beta 12
- External IDs: OMIM: 606338; MGI: 2136757; GeneCards: PCDHB12

Gene location (Human)
Chr.	Chromosome 5 (human)
Band	5q31.3	Start	141,208,697 bp
Band	5q31.3	End	141,212,571 bp

Gene location (Mouse)
Chr.	Chromosome 18 (mouse)
Band	18|18 B3	Start	37,630,044 bp
Band	18|18 B3	End	37,637,181 bp
RNA expression pattern
Bgee	Human / Mouse (ortholog); Top expressed in: ganglionic eminence; Achilles tendon; Descending thoracic aorta; smooth muscle tissue; body of uterus; gastric mucosa; ascending aorta; ventricular zone; right coronary artery; popliteal artery / Top expressed in: renal corpuscle; substantia nigra; trigeminal ganglion; fossa; superior frontal gyrus; medullary collecting duct; neuron; primary visual cortex; dentate gyrus of hippocampal formation granule cell; neural layer of retina; More reference expression data
BioGPS	n/a
Gene ontology
Molecular function	calcium ion binding
Cellular component	integral component of membrane; plasma membrane; integral component of plasma membrane; membrane
Biological process	cell adhesion; nervous system development; homophilic cell adhesion via plasma membrane adhesion molecules; chemical synaptic transmission; synapse assembly
Sources:Amigo / QuickGO
Orthologs
Databases	NCBI: entry; OMA: entry
Species	Human	Mouse
Entrez	56124	93890
Ensembl	ENSG00000120328	ENSMUSG00000043313
UniProt	Q9Y5F1	n/a
RefSeq (mRNA)	NM_018932	NM_053144
RefSeq (protein)	NP_061755	n/a
Location (UCSC)	Chr 5: 141.21 – 141.21 Mb	Chr 18: 37.63 – 37.64 Mb
PubMed search
- Wikidata
View/Edit Human	View/Edit Mouse

Protocadherin beta-12 is a protein that in humans is encoded by the PCDHB12 gene.

This gene is a member of the protocadherin beta gene cluster, one of three related gene clusters tandemly linked on chromosome five. The gene clusters demonstrate an unusual genomic organization similar to that of B-cell and T-cell receptor gene clusters. The beta cluster contains 16 genes and 3 pseudogenes, each encoding 6 extracellular cadherin domains and a cytoplasmic tail that deviates from others in the cadherin superfamily. The extracellular domains interact in a homophilic manner to specify differential cell-cell connections. Unlike the alpha and gamma clusters, the transcripts from these genes are made up of only one large exon, not sharing common 3' exons as expected. These neural cadherin-like cell adhesion proteins are integral plasma membrane proteins. Their specific functions are unknown but they most likely play a critical role in the establishment and function of specific cell-cell neural connections.
