= PCDH11Y =

Protein-coding gene in the species Homo sapiens

Identifiers
- Aliases: PCDH11Y, PCDH-PC, PCDH22, PCDHX, PCDHY, protocadherin 11 Y-linked
- External IDs: OMIM: 400022; GeneCards: PCDH11Y

Gene location (Human)
Chr.	Y chromosome (human)
Band	Yp11.2	Start	5,000,226 bp
Band	Yp11.2	End	5,742,224 bp
RNA expression pattern
Bgee	Human / Mouse (ortholog); Top expressed in: testicle; corpus callosum; prefrontal cortex; thoracic aorta; Brodmann area 9; ascending aorta; primary visual cortex; Descending thoracic aorta; ventricular zone; temporal lobe / n/a; More reference expression data
BioGPS	n/a
Gene ontology
Molecular function	calcium ion binding
Cellular component	integral component of membrane; plasma membrane; membrane; integral component of plasma membrane
Biological process	homophilic cell adhesion via plasma membrane adhesion molecules; cell adhesion
Sources:Amigo / QuickGO
Orthologs
Databases	NCBI: entry; OMA: entry
Species	Human	Mouse
Entrez	83259	n/a
Ensembl	ENSG00000099715	n/a
UniProt	Q9BZA8	n/a
RefSeq (mRNA)	NM_001278619; NM_032971; NM_032972; NM_032973; NM_001395587	n/a
RefSeq (protein)	NP_001265548; NP_116753; NP_116754; NP_116755	n/a
Location (UCSC)	Chr Y: 5 – 5.74 Mb	n/a
PubMed search		n/a
- Wikidata
View/Edit Human

PCDH11Y is a Y-linked gene in the genus Homo that encodes protocadherin 11Y, a protein that guides the development of nerve cells. It is the Y-chromosomal paralog of PCDH11X, which is located on the X chromosome and thus common to both sexes in humans and some of our nearest relatives including chimpanzees. 11X/Y are cadherin family genes, cell-adhesion molecules involved in neuronal signalling which attach to the surface of neurons. The X- and Y-isoforms respond in different ways to retinoic acid, a chemical involved in the development of embryos, which stimulates the activity of 11Y but suppresses that of 11X. It is one possible contributor towards the sex-biased neurophysiology of humans.

== Relevance to human evolution ==
It has been calculated that 11X transposed from the X to Y chromosome around three million years ago, perhaps coincident with the evolutionary expansion of human brain size and the first use of stone tools. A new intron and inversion also occurred in the 11Y around 120,000 to 200,000 years ago, coincident with the period of modern human expansion out of Africa (from which all non-African humans descend) and the onset of anthropologically modern culture termed behavioral modernity.

British psychiatrist Tim Crow, who worked on the evolution of human psychiatric disease such as schizophrenia, proposed the gene is a major contributor to lateralisation, which he believed underlies human cognitive abilities. Humans are a strong outlier in brain lateralisation among primates, which among other effects gives rise to our relatively unique handedness trait. Further, there is a substantial bias towards right-handedness in all modern humans as compared to chimpanzees: 90% of humans will use their right hands for minor motor tasks, whereas chimpanzees display no preference. Crow suggested this precludes a random or cultural origin for right-preference, adding that true ambidexterity is associated with developmental delay and psychosis.
