= PCDHA5 =

Protein-coding gene in the species Homo sapiens

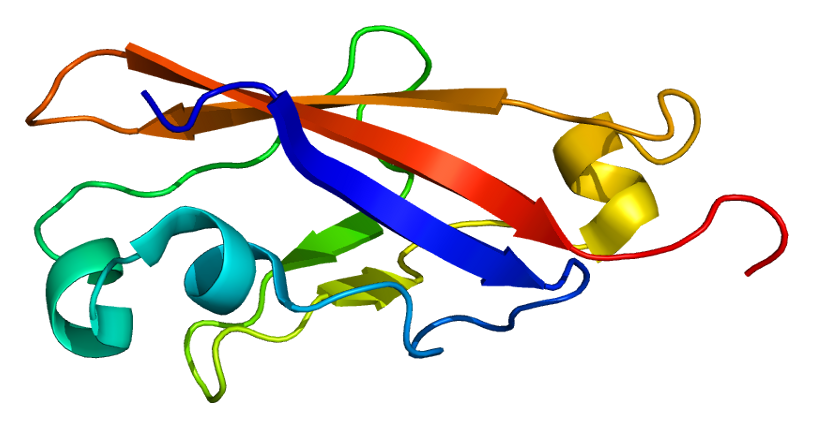

Identifiers
- Aliases: PCDHA5, CNR6, CNRN6, CNRS6, CRNR6, PCDH-ALPHA5, protocadherin alpha 5
- External IDs: OMIM: 606311; MGI: 1298371; GeneCards: PCDHA5

Gene location (Mouse)
Chr.	Chromosome 18 (mouse)
Band	18|18 B2- B3	Start	37,093,493 bp
Band	18|18 B2- B3	End	37,320,710 bp
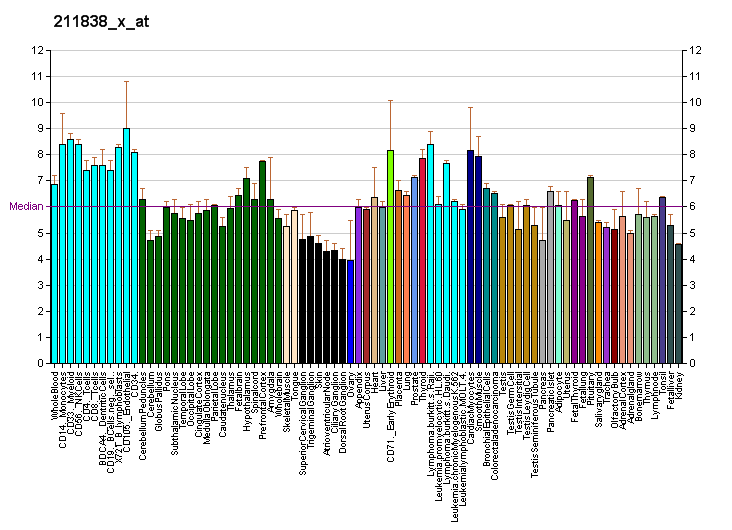
RNA expression pattern
Bgee	Human / Mouse (ortholog); Top expressed in: prefrontal cortex; islet of Langerhans; superior frontal gyrus; cerebellum; cerebellar cortex; cerebellar hemisphere; Brodmann area 9; ganglionic eminence; temporal lobe; amygdala / Top expressed in: embryo; granular layer; granular layer of dentate gyrus; Purkinje cell; hippocampus proper; Region I of hippocampus proper; striatum of neuraxis; Cortex of frontal lobe; superior frontal gyrus; primary visual cortex; More reference expression data
BioGPS	More reference expression data
Gene ontology
Molecular function	calcium ion binding
Cellular component	integral component of membrane; plasma membrane; integral component of plasma membrane; membrane
Biological process	cell adhesion; nervous system development; homophilic cell adhesion via plasma membrane adhesion molecules; cell-cell signaling
Sources:Amigo / QuickGO
Orthologs
Databases	NCBI: entry
Species	Human	Mouse
Entrez	56143	12941
Ensembl	n/a	ENSMUSG00000103092
UniProt	Q9Y5H7	Q91Y15
RefSeq (mRNA)	NM_031501; NM_018908	NM_009959
RefSeq (protein)	NP_061731; NP_113689	NP_034089
Location (UCSC)	n/a	Chr 18: 37.09 – 37.32 Mb
PubMed search
- Wikidata
View/Edit Human	View/Edit Mouse

Protocadherin alpha-5 is a protein that in humans is encoded by the PCDHA5 gene.

This gene is a member of the protocadherin alpha gene cluster, one of three related gene clusters tandemly linked on chromosome 5 that demonstrate an unusual genomic organization similar to that of B-cell and T-cell receptor gene clusters.

The alpha gene cluster is composed of 15 cadherin superfamily genes related to the mouse CNR genes and consists of 13 highly similar and 2 more distantly related coding sequences. The tandem array of 15 N-terminal exons, or variable exons, are followed by downstream C-terminal exons, or constant exons, which are shared by all genes in the cluster. The large, uninterrupted N-terminal exons each encode six cadherin ectodomains while the C-terminal exons encode the cytoplasmic domain.

These neural cadherin-like cell adhesion proteins are integral plasma membrane proteins that most likely play a critical role in the establishment and function of specific cell-cell connections in the brain. Alternative splicing has been observed and additional variants have been suggested but their full-length nature has yet to be determined.
