= PCDH20 =

Protein-coding gene in the species Homo sapiens

Identifiers
- Aliases: PCDH20, PCDH13, protocadherin 20
- External IDs: OMIM: 614449; MGI: 2443376; GeneCards: PCDH20

Gene location (Human)
Chr.	Chromosome 13 (human)
Band	13q21.2	Start	61,409,685 bp
Band	13q21.2	End	61,415,522 bp

Gene location (Mouse)
Chr.	Chromosome 14 (mouse)
Band	14|14 E1	Start	88,702,179 bp
Band	14|14 E1	End	88,708,832 bp
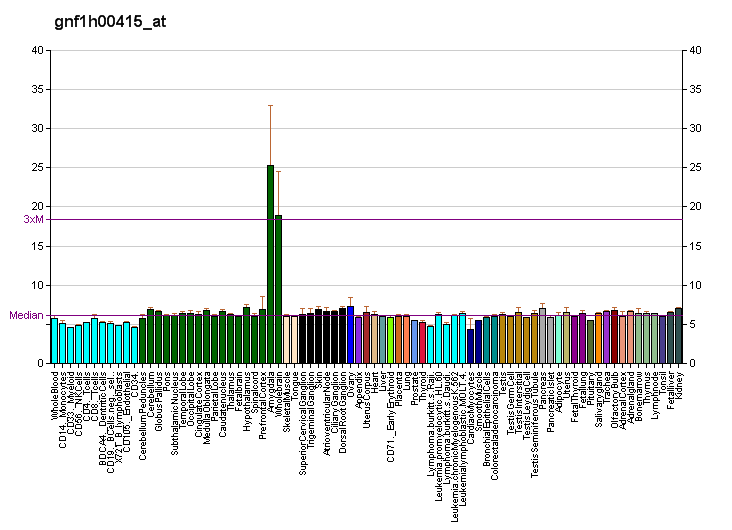
RNA expression pattern
Bgee	Human / Mouse (ortholog); Top expressed in: superior frontal gyrus; testicle; prefrontal cortex; hippocampus proper; popliteal artery; tibial arteries; Achilles tendon; Brodmann area 9; anterior cingulate cortex; Descending thoracic aorta / Top expressed in: utricle; vestibular sensory epithelium; vestibular membrane of cochlear duct; dentate gyrus; dentate gyrus of hippocampal formation granule cell; hippocampus proper; lumbar subsegment of spinal cord; endolymphatic duct; Region I of hippocampus proper; mammillary body; More reference expression data
BioGPS	More reference expression data
Gene ontology
Molecular function	calcium ion binding; RNA binding
Cellular component	integral component of membrane; plasma membrane; membrane; integral component of plasma membrane
Biological process	cell adhesion; homophilic cell adhesion via plasma membrane adhesion molecules
Sources:Amigo / QuickGO
Orthologs
Databases	NCBI: entry; OMA: entry
Species	Human	Mouse
Entrez	64881	219257
Ensembl	ENSG00000280165	ENSMUSG00000050505
UniProt	Q8N6Y1	Q8BIZ0
RefSeq (mRNA)	NM_022843	NM_178685
RefSeq (protein)	NP_073754	NP_848800
Location (UCSC)	Chr 13: 61.41 – 61.42 Mb	Chr 14: 88.7 – 88.71 Mb
PubMed search
- Wikidata
View/Edit Human	View/Edit Mouse

Protocadherin-20 is a protein that in humans is encoded by the PCDH20 gene.

This gene belongs to the protocadherin gene family, a subfamily of the cadherin superfamily. This gene encodes a protein which contains 6 extracellular cadherin domains, a transmembrane domain and a cytoplasmic tail differing from those of the classical cadherins. Although its specific function is undetermined, the cadherin-related neuronal receptor is thought to play a role in the establishment and function of specific cell-cell connections in the brain.
