= PCDHA4 =

Protein-coding gene in the species Homo sapiens

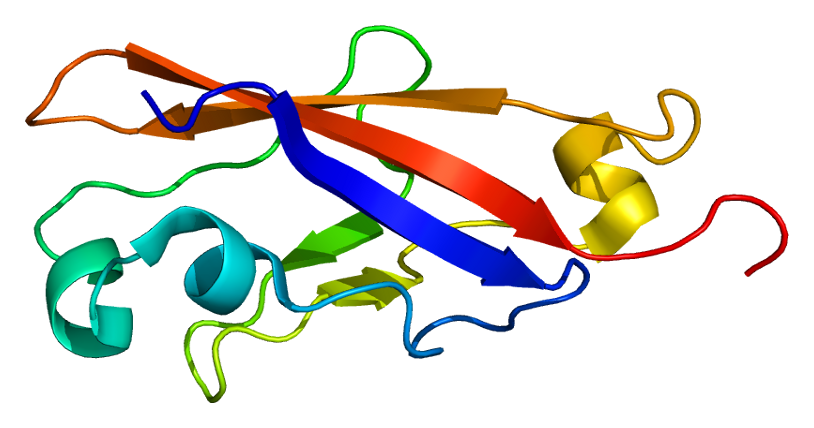

Identifiers
- Aliases: PCDHA4, CNR1, CNRN1, CRNR1, PCDH-ALPHA4, protocadherin alpha 4
- External IDs: OMIM: 606310; MGI: 1298406; GeneCards: PCDHA4
Available structures
| PDB | Ortholog search: PDBe RCSB |
| PDB | List of PDB id codes 1WUZ |

Gene location (Human)
| Chr. | Chromosome 5 (human) |
| Band | 5q31.3 | Start | 140,806,929 bp |
| Band | 5q31.3 | End | 141,012,347 bp |

Gene location (Mouse)
| Chr. | Chromosome 18 (mouse) |
| Band | 18|18 B2- B3 | Start | 37,085,701 bp |
| Band | 18|18 B2- B3 | End | 37,320,714 bp |
RNA expression pattern
| Bgee | Human / Mouse (ortholog); Top expressed in: stromal cell of endometrium; islet of Langerhans; prefrontal cortex; ganglionic eminence; gallbladder; superior frontal gyrus; ventricular zone; cerebellum; cerebellar cortex; cerebellar hemisphere / Top expressed in: hippocampus proper; dentate gyrus of hippocampal formation granule cell; embryo; granular layer; Cortex of frontal lobe; primary visual cortex; superior frontal gyrus; granular layer of dentate gyrus; Purkinje cell; Region I of hippocampus proper; More reference expression data |
| BioGPS | n/a |
Gene ontology
| Molecular function | protein binding; calcium ion binding; metal ion binding; identical protein binding |
| Cellular component | integral component of membrane; plasma membrane; integral component of plasma membrane; membrane; endoplasmic reticulum; synapse |
| Biological process | cell adhesion; nervous system development; homophilic cell adhesion via plasma membrane adhesion molecules; cell-cell signaling |
Sources:Amigo / QuickGO
Orthologs
| Databases | NCBI: entry; OMA: entry |
| Species | Human | Mouse |
| Entrez | 56144 | 12936 |
| Ensembl | ENSG00000204967 | ENSMUSG00000104252 |
| UniProt | Q9UN74 | O88689 |
| RefSeq (mRNA) | NM_031500; NM_018907 | NM_007766 |
| RefSeq (protein) | NP_061730; NP_113688 | NP_001167625 |
| Location (UCSC) | Chr 5: 140.81 – 141.01 Mb | Chr 18: 37.09 – 37.32 Mb |
| PubMed search |
- Wikidata
| View/Edit Human | View/Edit Mouse |

Protocadherin alpha-4 is a protein that in humans is encoded by the PCDHA4 gene.

This gene is a member of the protocadherin alpha gene cluster, one of three related gene clusters tandemly linked on chromosome five that demonstrate an unusual genomic organization similar to that of B-cell and T-cell receptor gene clusters. The alpha gene cluster is composed of 15 cadherin superfamily genes related to the mouse CNR genes and consists of 13 highly similar and 2 more distantly related coding sequences. The tandem array of 15 N-terminal exons, or variable exons, are followed by downstream C-terminal exons, or constant exons, which are shared by all genes in the cluster. The large, uninterrupted N-terminal exons each encode six cadherin ectodomains while the C-terminal exons encode the cytoplasmic domain. These neural cadherin-like cell adhesion proteins are integral plasma membrane proteins that most likely play a critical role in the establishment and function of specific cell-cell connections in the brain. Alternative splicing has been observed and additional variants have been suggested but their full-length nature has yet to be determined.
