= PCDHGA12 =

Protein-coding gene in the species Homo sapiens

Identifiers
- Aliases: PCDHGA12, CDH21, FIB3, PCDH-GAMMA-A12, protocadherin gamma subfamily A, 12
- External IDs: OMIM: 603059; MGI: 1935229; GeneCards: PCDHGA12

Gene location (Human)
| Chr. | Chromosome 5 (human) |
| Band | 5q31.3 | Start | 141,430,507 bp |
| Band | 5q31.3 | End | 141,512,975 bp |

Gene location (Mouse)
| Chr. | Chromosome 18 (mouse) |
| Band | 18|18 B3 | Start | 37,898,633 bp |
| Band | 18|18 B3 | End | 37,974,926 bp |
RNA expression pattern
| Bgee | Human / Mouse (ortholog); Top expressed in: stromal cell of endometrium; gonad; caudate nucleus; right coronary artery; amygdala; nucleus accumbens; left adrenal gland; right lung; left adrenal cortex; gallbladder / Top expressed in: Meckel's cartilage; humerus; occiput; occipital bone; chondrocranium; temporal bone; lower leg; dental papilla; ganglionic eminence; sphenoid bone; More reference expression data |
| BioGPS | n/a |
Gene ontology
| Molecular function | calcium ion binding |
| Cellular component | integral component of membrane; plasma membrane; membrane; integral component of plasma membrane; cell-cell junction |
| Biological process | homophilic cell adhesion via plasma membrane adhesion molecules; cell adhesion; cell-cell signaling; nervous system development |
Sources:Amigo / QuickGO
Orthologs
| Databases | NCBI: entry; OMA: entry |
| Species | Human | Mouse |
| Entrez | 26025 | 93724 |
| Ensembl | ENSG00000253159 | ENSMUSG00000102428 |
| UniProt | O60330 | Q91XY7 |
| RefSeq (mRNA) | NM_032094; NM_003735 | NM_033595 |
| RefSeq (protein) | NP_003726; NP_115265 | NP_291073 |
| Location (UCSC) | Chr 5: 141.43 – 141.51 Mb | Chr 18: 37.9 – 37.97 Mb |
| PubMed search |
- Wikidata
| View/Edit Human | View/Edit Mouse |

Protocadherin gamma-A12 is a protein that in humans is encoded by the PCDHGA12 gene.

This gene is a member of the protocadherin gamma gene cluster, one of three related clusters tandemly linked on chromosome five. These gene clusters have an immunoglobulin-like organization, suggesting that a novel mechanism may be involved in their regulation and expression. The gamma gene cluster includes 22 genes divided into 3 subfamilies. Subfamily A contains 12 genes, subfamily B contains 7 genes and 2 pseudogenes, and the more distantly related subfamily C contains 3 genes. The tandem array of 22 large, variable region exons are followed by a constant region, containing 3 exons shared by all genes in the cluster. Each variable region exon encodes the extracellular region, which includes 6 cadherin ectodomains and a transmembrane region. The constant region exons encode the common cytoplasmic region. These neural cadherin-like cell adhesion proteins most likely play a critical role in the establishment and function of specific cell-cell connections in the brain. Alternative splicing has been described for the gamma cluster genes.
