= Protocadherin alpha 1 =

Protein-coding gene in the species Homo sapiens

PCDHA1

Identifiers
- Aliases: PCDHA1, PCDH-ALPHA1, Protocadherin alpha 1
- External IDs: OMIM: 606307; MGI: 2150982; GeneCards: PCDHA1

Gene location (Human)
Chr.	Chromosome 5 (human)
Band	5q31.3	Start	140,786,136 bp
Band	5q31.3	End	141,012,347 bp

Gene location (Mouse)
Chr.	Chromosome 18 (mouse)
Band	18|18 B2- B3	Start	37,063,237 bp
Band	18|18 B2- B3	End	37,320,714 bp
RNA expression pattern
Bgee	Human / Mouse (ortholog); Top expressed in: prefrontal cortex; C1 segment; superior frontal gyrus; islet of Langerhans; primary visual cortex; Brodmann area 9; anterior cingulate cortex; cerebellum; cerebellar cortex; nucleus accumbens / Top expressed in: enteric nervous system; hippocampus proper; striatum of neuraxis; olfactory bulb; hypothalamus; cerebellum; cerebellar cortex; Cortex of frontal lobe; primary visual cortex; dentate gyrus of hippocampal formation granule cell; More reference expression data
BioGPS	n/a
Gene ontology
Molecular function	calcium ion binding
Cellular component	integral component of membrane; extracellular region; integral component of plasma membrane; membrane; plasma membrane; endoplasmic reticulum
Biological process	cell adhesion; nervous system development; homophilic cell adhesion via plasma membrane adhesion molecules; cell-cell signaling
Sources:Amigo / QuickGO
Orthologs
Databases	NCBI: entry; OMA: entry
Species	Human	Mouse
Entrez	56147	116731
Ensembl	ENSG00000204970	ENSMUSG00000103442
UniProt	Q9Y5I3	n/a
RefSeq (mRNA)	NM_031411; NM_018900; NM_031410	NM_054072
RefSeq (protein)	NP_061723; NP_113598; NP_113599	n/a
Location (UCSC)	Chr 5: 140.79 – 141.01 Mb	Chr 18: 37.06 – 37.32 Mb
PubMed search
- Wikidata
View/Edit Human	View/Edit Mouse

Protocadherin alpha-1 is a protein that in humans is encoded by the PCDHA1 gene.

This gene is a member of the protocadherin alpha gene cluster, one of three related gene clusters tandemly linked on chromosome five that demonstrate an unusual genomic organization similar to that of B-cell and T-cell receptor gene clusters. The alpha gene cluster is composed of 15 cadherin superfamily genes related to the mouse CNR genes and consists of 13 highly similar and two more distantly related coding sequences. The tandem array of 15 N-terminal exons, or variable exons, are followed by downstream C-terminal exons, or constant exons, which are shared by all genes in the cluster. The large, uninterrupted N-terminal exons each encode six cadherin ectodomains, while the C-terminal exons encode the cytoplasmic domain. These neural cadherin-like cell adhesion proteins are integral plasma membrane proteins that most likely play a critical role in the establishment and function of specific cell-cell connections in the brain. Alternative splicing has been observed, and additional variants have been suggested, but their full-length nature has yet to be determined.
