= PCDHA6 =

Protein-coding gene in the species Homo sapiens

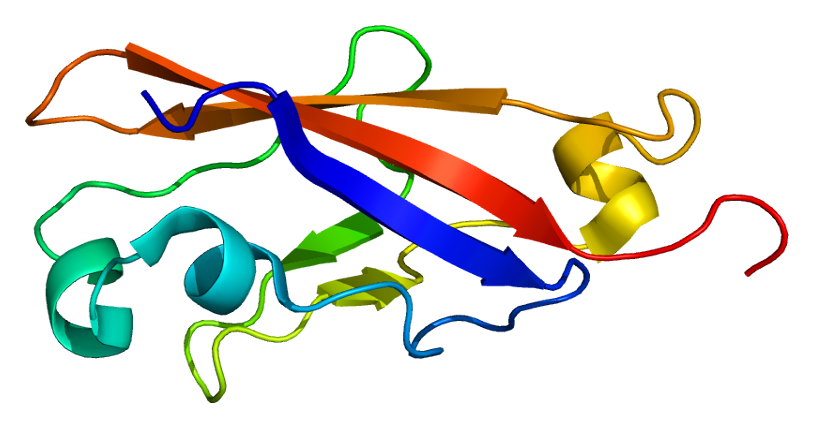

Identifiers
- Aliases: PCDHA6, CNR2, CNRN2, CNRS2, CRNR2, PCDH-ALPHA6, protocadherin alpha 6
- External IDs: OMIM: 606312; MGI: 1298367; GeneCards: PCDHA6

Gene location (Human)
Chr.	Chromosome 5 (human)
Band	5q31.3	Start	140,827,958 bp
Band	5q31.3	End	141,012,347 bp

Gene location (Mouse)
Chr.	Chromosome 18 (mouse)
Band	18|18 B2- B3	Start	37,100,684 bp
Band	18|18 B2- B3	End	37,320,710 bp
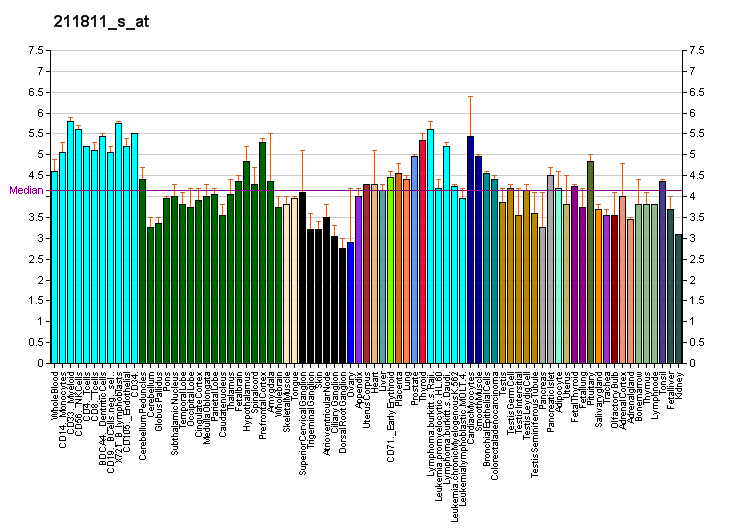
RNA expression pattern
Bgee	Human / Mouse (ortholog); Top expressed in: testicle; islet of Langerhans; prefrontal cortex; ganglionic eminence; cerebellar cortex; cerebellar hemisphere; Brodmann area 9; right hemisphere of cerebellum; C1 segment; ventricular zone / Top expressed in: embryo; granular layer; granular layer of dentate gyrus; Purkinje cell; dentate gyrus of hippocampal formation granule cell; Region I of hippocampus proper; striatum of neuraxis; hippocampus proper; CA3 field; neural tube; More reference expression data
BioGPS	More reference expression data
Gene ontology
Molecular function	calcium ion binding
Cellular component	integral component of membrane; extracellular region; plasma membrane; integral component of plasma membrane; membrane
Biological process	cell adhesion; nervous system development; homophilic cell adhesion via plasma membrane adhesion molecules; cell-cell signaling
Sources:Amigo / QuickGO
Orthologs
Databases	NCBI: entry; OMA: entry
Species	Human	Mouse
Entrez	56142	12937
Ensembl	ENSG00000081842	ENSMUSG00000103707
UniProt	Q9UN73	n/a
RefSeq (mRNA)	NM_031849; NM_018909; NM_031848	NM_007767
RefSeq (protein)	NP_061732; NP_114036; NP_114037	n/a
Location (UCSC)	Chr 5: 140.83 – 141.01 Mb	Chr 18: 37.1 – 37.32 Mb
PubMed search
- Wikidata
View/Edit Human	View/Edit Mouse

Protocadherin alpha-6 is a protein that in humans is encoded by the PCDHA6 gene.

This gene is a member of the protocadherin alpha gene cluster, one of three related gene clusters tandemly linked on chromosome five that demonstrate an unusual genomic organization similar to that of B-cell and T-cell receptor gene clusters. The alpha gene cluster is composed of 15 cadherin superfamily genes related to the mouse CNR genes and consists of 13 highly similar and 2 more distantly related coding sequences. The tandem array of 15 N-terminal exons, or variable exons, are followed by downstream C-terminal exons, or constant exons, which are shared by all genes in the cluster. The large, uninterrupted N-terminal exons each encode six cadherin ectodomains while the C-terminal exons encode the cytoplasmic domain. These neural cadherin-like cell adhesion proteins are integral plasma membrane proteins that most likely play a critical role in the establishment and function of specific cell-cell connections in the brain. Alternative splicing has been observed and additional variants have been suggested but their full-length nature has yet to be determined.
