= PCDHB7 =

Protein-coding gene in the species Homo sapiens

Identifiers
- Aliases: PCDHB7, PCDH-BETA7, protocadherin beta 7
- External IDs: OMIM: 606333; MGI: 2136750; GeneCards: PCDHB7

Gene location (Human)
Chr.	Chromosome 5 (human)
Band	5q31.3	Start	141,172,644 bp
Band	5q31.3	End	141,176,383 bp

Gene location (Mouse)
Chr.	Chromosome 18 (mouse)
Band	18|18 B3	Start	37,606,593 bp
Band	18|18 B3	End	37,609,393 bp
RNA expression pattern
Bgee	Human / Mouse (ortholog); Top expressed in: visceral pleura; parietal pleura; Descending thoracic aorta; ganglionic eminence; smooth muscle tissue; ascending aorta; popliteal artery; tibial arteries; lactiferous gland; lactiferous duct / Top expressed in: Region I of hippocampus proper; submandibular gland; ciliary body; gastrula; sciatic nerve; nucleus of stria terminalis; iris; olfactory tubercle; globus pallidus; medial dorsal nucleus; More reference expression data
BioGPS	n/a
Gene ontology
Molecular function	calcium ion binding
Cellular component	integral component of membrane; plasma membrane; membrane; integral component of plasma membrane
Biological process	homophilic cell adhesion via plasma membrane adhesion molecules; cell adhesion; chemical synaptic transmission; synapse assembly
Sources:Amigo / QuickGO
Orthologs
Databases	NCBI: entry; OMA: entry
Species	Human	Mouse
Entrez	56129	93886
Ensembl	ENSG00000113212	ENSMUSG00000047033
UniProt	Q9Y5E2	Q91Y04
RefSeq (mRNA)	NM_018940	NM_053140
RefSeq (protein)	NP_061763	NP_444370
Location (UCSC)	Chr 5: 141.17 – 141.18 Mb	Chr 18: 37.61 – 37.61 Mb
PubMed search
- Wikidata
View/Edit Human	View/Edit Mouse

Protocadherin beta-7 is a protein that in humans is encoded by the PCDHB7 gene.

This gene is a member of the protocadherin beta gene cluster, one of three related gene clusters tandemly linked on chromosome five. The gene clusters demonstrate an unusual genomic organization similar to that of B-cell and T-cell receptor gene clusters. The beta cluster contains 16 genes and 3 pseudogenes, each encoding 6 extracellular cadherin domains and a cytoplasmic tail that deviates from others in the cadherin superfamily. The extracellular domains interact in a homophilic manner to specify differential cell-cell connections. Unlike the alpha and gamma clusters, the transcripts from these genes are made up of only one large exon, not sharing common 3' exons as expected. These neural cadherin-like cell adhesion proteins are integral plasma membrane proteins. Their specific functions are unknown but they most likely play a critical role in the establishment and function of specific cell-cell neural connections. The transcript for this particular family member uses more than one polyadenylation site.
