= PCDHB16 =

Protein-coding gene in the species Homo sapiens

Identifiers
- Aliases: PCDHB16, ME1, PCDH-BETA16, PCDH3X, PCDHB8a, protocadherin beta 16
- External IDs: OMIM: 606345; MGI: 2136754; GeneCards: PCDHB16

Gene location (Human)
Chr.	Chromosome 5 (human)
Band	5q31.3	Start	141,182,387 bp
Band	5q31.3	End	141,186,226 bp

Gene location (Mouse)
Chr.	Chromosome 18 (mouse)
Band	18|18 B3	Start	37,617,848 bp
Band	18|18 B3	End	37,622,507 bp
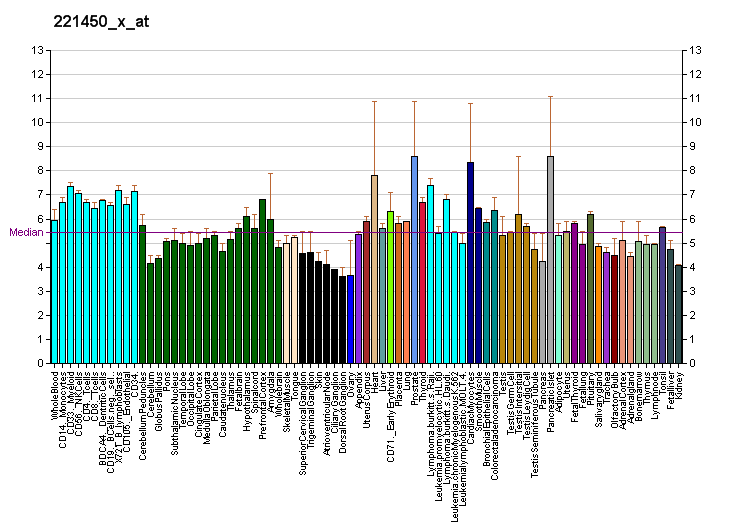
RNA expression pattern
Bgee	Human / Mouse (ortholog); Top expressed in: corpus epididymis; caput epididymis; tail of epididymis; pancreatic epithelial cell; synovial membrane; visceral pleura; germinal epithelium; synovial joint; sural nerve; islet of Langerhans / Top expressed in: interventricular septum; olfactory epithelium; olfactory tubercle; lobe of cerebellum; iris; vestibular sensory epithelium; primary motor cortex; stria vascularis; carotid body; piriform cortex; More reference expression data
BioGPS	More reference expression data
Gene ontology
Molecular function	calcium ion binding
Cellular component	integral component of membrane; plasma membrane; membrane; integral component of plasma membrane
Biological process	calcium-dependent cell-cell adhesion via plasma membrane cell adhesion molecules; synapse assembly; homophilic cell adhesion via plasma membrane adhesion molecules; chemical synaptic transmission; cell adhesion
Sources:Amigo / QuickGO
Orthologs
Databases	NCBI: entry; OMA: entry
Species	Human	Mouse
Entrez	57717	93888
Ensembl	ENSG00000272674	ENSMUSG00000046387
UniProt	Q9NRJ7	Q91VD8
RefSeq (mRNA)	NM_020957	NM_053142
RefSeq (protein)	NP_066008	NP_444372
Location (UCSC)	Chr 5: 141.18 – 141.19 Mb	Chr 18: 37.62 – 37.62 Mb
PubMed search
- Wikidata
View/Edit Human	View/Edit Mouse

Protocadherin beta-16 is a protein that in humans is encoded by the PCDHB16 gene.

This gene is a member of the protocadherin beta gene cluster, one of three related gene clusters tandemly linked on chromosome five. The gene clusters demonstrate an unusual genomic organization similar to that of B-cell and T-cell receptor gene clusters. The beta cluster contains 16 genes and 3 pseudogenes, each encoding 6 extracellular cadherin domains and a cytoplasmic tail that deviates from others in the cadherin superfamily. The extracellular domains interact in a homophilic manner to specify differential cell-cell connections. Unlike the alpha and gamma clusters, the transcripts from these genes are made up of only one large exon, not sharing common 3' exons as expected. These neural cadherin-like cell adhesion proteins are integral plasma membrane proteins. Their specific functions are unknown but they most likely play a critical role in the establishment and function of specific cell-cell neural connections.
