= Terminology of homosexuality =

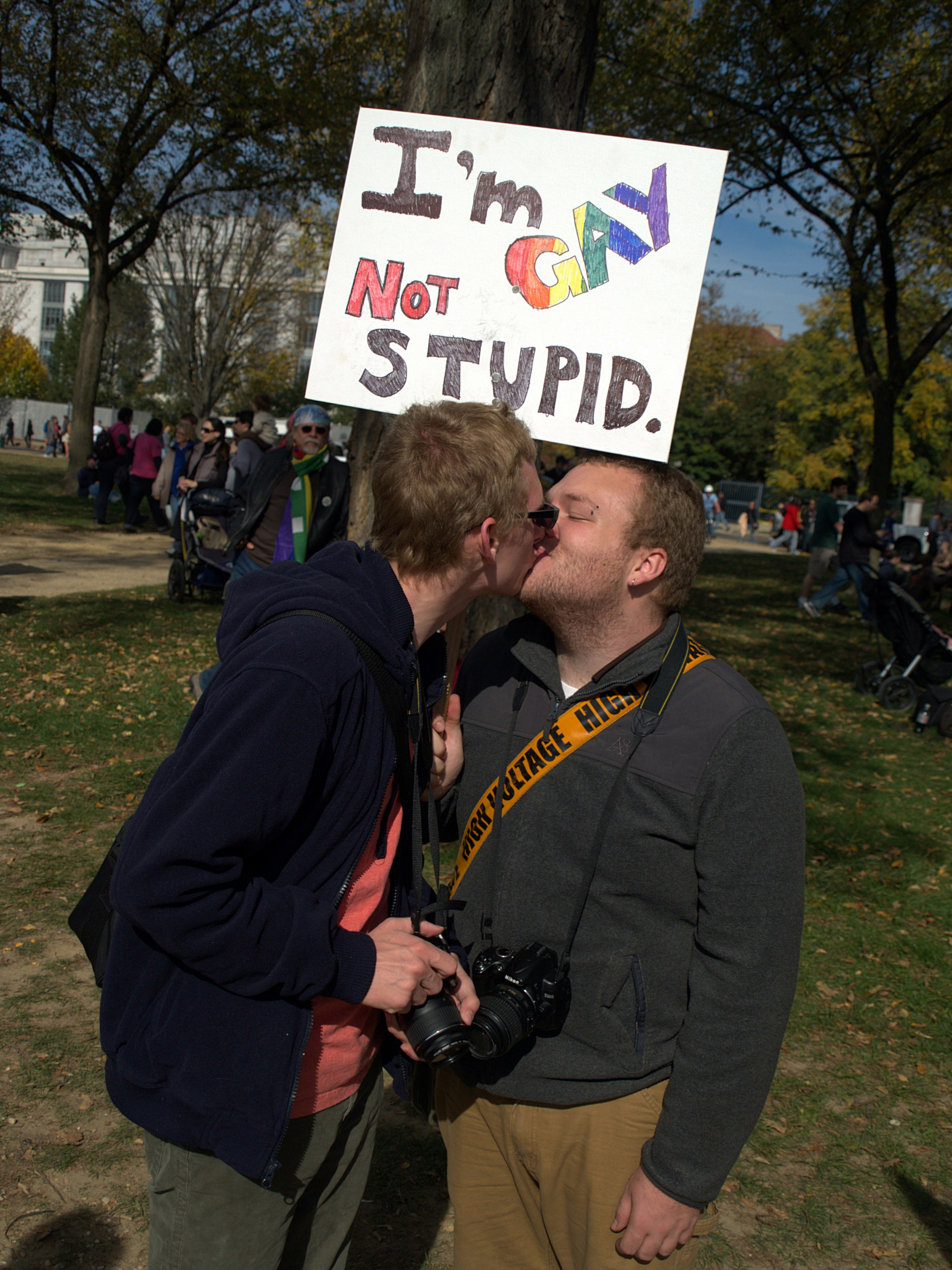
Two men at the Rally to Restore Sanity and/or Fear indicate their identity with the word gay.

Terms used to describe homosexuality have gone through many changes since the emergence of the first terms in the mid-19th century. In English, some terms in widespread use have been sodomite, Sapphic, Uranian or Urning, homophile, lesbian, gay, and queer. Some of these words are specific to women, some to men, and some can be used of either. Gay people may also be identified under the umbrella term LGBT.

Homosexual was coined in German in 1868. Academia continues to coin related terms, including androphilia and gynephilia which designate only the object of attraction, thus divorcing the terms from sexual orientation entirely.

Numerous slang terms exist for homosexuals or homosexuality. Some communities have cants, a rich jargon used among a subgroup almost like a secret language, such as Polari in the UK, and others.

== Prescribed usage ==
The term homosexual can be used as an adjective to describe the sexual attractions and behaviors of people attracted to the same sex. Author and gay pioneer Quentin Crisp said that the term should be "homosexualist", adding that no one says "I am a sexual". Some gay people argue that the use of homosexual as a noun is offensive, arguing that they are people first and their homosexuality is merely an attribute of their humanity. Even if they do not consider the term offensive, some people in same-gender relationships may object to being described as homosexual because they identify as bisexual+, or another orientation such as (rarely) "unstraight".

Some style guides recommend that the terms homosexual and homosexuality be avoided altogether, lest their use cause confusion or arouse controversy. In particular, the description of individuals as homosexual may be offensive, partially because of the negative clinical association of the word stemming from its use in describing same-gender attraction as a pathological state before homosexuality was removed from the American Psychiatric Association's list of mental disorders in 1973. The Associated Press and The New York Times style guides restrict usage of the terms.

Same-gender oriented people seldom apply such terms to themselves, and public officials and agencies often avoid them. For instance, the Safe Schools Coalition of Washington's Glossary for School Employees advises that gay is the "preferred synonym for homosexual", and goes on to suggest avoiding the term homosexual as it is "clinical, distancing, and archaic".

However, the terms homosexual and homosexuality are sometimes deemed appropriate in referring to behavior (although same-gender is the preferred adjective). Using homosexuality or homosexual to refer to behavior may be inaccurate but does not carry the same potentially offensive connotations that using homosexual to describe a person does. When referring to people, homosexual might be considered derogatory and the terms gay and lesbian are preferred. Some have argued that homosexual places emphasis on sexuality over humanity, and is to be avoided when describing a person. Gay man or lesbian are the preferred nouns for referring to people, which stress cultural and social matters over sex.

The New Oxford American Dictionary says that gay is the preferred term.

People with a same-gender sexual orientation generally prefer the terms gay, lesbian, or bisexual. The most common terms are gay (both men and women) and lesbian (women only). Other terms include same gender loving and same-sex-oriented.

Among some sectors of gay sub-culture, same-gender sexual behavior is sometimes viewed as solely for physical pleasure instead of romantic attraction. Men on the down-low (or DL) may engage in covert sexual activity with other men while pursuing sexual and romantic relationships with women.

== History ==
The choice of terms regarding sexual orientation may imply a certain political outlook, and different terms have been preferred at different times and in different places.

=== Early history ===
Historian and philosopher Michel Foucault argued that homosexual and heterosexual identities did not emerge until the 19th century. Prior to that time, he said, the terms described practices and not identity. Foucault cited Karl Westphal's famous 1870 article Contrary Sexual Feeling as the "date of birth" of the categorization of sexual orientation. Some scholars, however, have argued that there are significant continuities between past and present conceptualizations of sexuality, with various terms having been used for homosexuality.

In his Symposium, the ancient Greek philosopher Plato described (through the character of the profane comedian Aristophanes) three sexual orientations – heterosexuality, male homosexuality, and female homosexuality – and provided explanations for their existence using an invented creation myth.

=== Tribadism ===
Although this term refers to a specific sex act between women today, in the past it was commonly used to describe female-female sexual love in general, and women who had sex with women were called Tribads or Tribades. As author Rictor Norton explains:

The tribas, lesbian, from Greek tribein, to rub (i.e. rubbing the pudenda together, or clitoris upon pubic bone, etc.), appears in Greek and Latin satires from the late first century. The tribade was the most common (vulgar) lesbian in European texts for many centuries. 'Tribade' occurs in English texts from at least as early as 1601 to at least as late as the mid-nineteenth century before it became self-consciously old-fashioned—it was in current use for nearly three centuries.

Fricatrice, a synonym for tribade that also refers to rubbing but has a Latin rather than a Greek root, appeared in English as early as 1605 (in Ben Jonson's Volpone). Its usage suggests that it was more colloquial and more pejorative than tribade. Variants include the Latinized confricatrice and English rubster.

=== Sodomy ===
Though sodomy has been used to refer to a range of homosexual and heterosexual "unnatural acts", the term sodomite usually refers to a homosexual male even though the real meaning is of unreproductive sex. The term is derived from the Biblical tale of Sodom and Gomorrah, and Christian churches have referred to the crimen sodomitae (crime of the Sodomites) for centuries. The modern association with homosexuality can be found as early as AD 96 in the writings of the Jewish historian Josephus. In the early 5th century, Jerome, a priest, historian, and theologian used the forms Sodoman, in Sodomis, Sodomorum, Sodomæ, Sodomitæ. The modern German word Sodomie and the Norwegian sodomi also refer to bestiality. Sodomy in historical biblical reference may not pertain to the acts of homosexuality, but the acts of bestiality and female and male castration for the purpose of sexual slavery.

=== Lesbianism ===
Lesbian writer Emma Donoghue found that the term lesbian (with its modern meaning) has been in use in the English language from at least the 18th century. The 1732 epic poem by William King, The Toast, uses "lesbian loves" and "tribadism" interchangeably: "she loved Women in the same Manner as Men love them; she was a Tribad".

=== Sapphism ===
Named after the female Greek poet Sappho who lived on Lesbos Island and wrote love poems to women, this term has been in use since at least the 18th century, with the connotation of lesbian. In 1773, a London magazine described sex between women as "Sapphic passion". The adjective form Sapphic is sometimes used nowadays as an inclusive umbrella term that expresses the sexuality and romantic attraction of queer women, including bisexuals, nonbinary, and trans people However, this is not accepted by all women who identify as lesbian.

=== Pederasty ===
Today, pederasty refers to male attraction towards adolescent boys, or the cultural institutions that support such relations, as in ancient Greece. However, in the 18th and 19th centuries, the word usually referred to male homosexuality in general. A pederast was also the active partner in anal sex, whether with a male or a female partner. This relationship is socially frowned upon in modern cultures while legally defined by the age of consent.

=== Homosexual ===
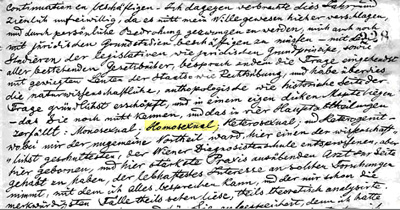
Karl-Maria Kertbeny coined the word homosexual in this 1868 letter.

The word homosexual translates literally as "of the same sex", being a hybrid of the Greek prefix homo- meaning 'same' (as distinguished from the Latin root homo meaning 'human') and the Latin root sex meaning 'sex'.

The first known public appearance of the term homosexual in print is found in an 1869 German pamphlet 143 des Preussischen Strafgesetzbuchs und seine Aufrechterhaltung als 152 des Entwurfs eines Strafgesetzbuchs für den Norddeutschen Bund ("Paragraph 143 of the Prussian Penal Code and Its Maintenance as Paragraph 152 of the Draft of a Penal Code for the North German Confederation"). The pamphlet was written by Karl-Maria Kertbeny, but published anonymously. It advocated the repeal of Prussia's sodomy laws. Kertbeny had previously used the word in a private letter written in 1868 to Karl Heinrich Ulrichs. Kertbeny used Homosexualität (in English, 'homosexuality') in place of Ulrichs' Urningtum; Homosexualisten ('male homosexualists') instead of Urninge, and Homosexualistinnen ('female homosexualists') instead of Urninden.

The term was coined and originally used primarily by German psychiatrists and psychologists. Havelock Ellis in his 1901 Studies in the Psychology of Sex wrote about the evolving terminology in the area, which ended up settling on homosexuality. In the preface to the first edition (1900), Ellis calls it sexual inversion, and volume 2 of the book is titled "Sexual Inversion". In the preface to the third edition (1927) Ellis referred to it as "the study of homosexuality". On the first page of chapter 1, he discusses the terminology, naming Ulrichs' use of Uranian (German: Uranier) from 1862, which later morphed into Urning or Uranian (or Dionian or Dioning as the female counterpart) and using Urningtum (as the name of the condition. Ellis reported that the first accepted scientific term was contrary sexual feeling (Konträre Sexualempfindung), coined by Westphal in 1869 and used by Krafft-Ebing and others. This term was never used outside Germany, and soon went out of favor even there. The term homosexuality was invented by Kertbeny in the same year (1869) but attracted no attention for some time, later achieving prominence. It was easily translatable into many languages, including by Hirschfeld in his 1914 book Die Homosexualität des Mannes und des Weibes, one of the top authorities in the field. Ellis continued to use both the terms sexual inversion and homosexuality in the 3rd edition, with slightly different meanings.

The first known use of homosexual in English is in Charles Gilbert Chaddock's 1892 translation of Richard von Krafft-Ebing's Psychopathia Sexualis, a study on sexual practices. The term was popularized by the 1906 Harden–Eulenburg Affair.

The word homosexual itself had different connotations 100 years ago than today. Although some early writers used the adjective homosexual to refer to any single-gender context (such as an all-girls school), today the term implies a sexual aspect. The term homosocial is now used to describe single-sex contexts that are not of a romantic or sexual nature.

The colloquial abbreviation homo for homosexual is a coinage of the interbellum period, first recorded as a noun in 1929, and as an adjective in 1933. Today, it is often considered a derogatory epithet.

=== Homophile ===
Coined by the German astrologist, author and psychoanalyst Karl-Günther Heimsoth in his 1924 doctoral dissertation Hetero- und Homophilie, the term was in common use in the 1950s and 1960s by homosexual organizations and publications; the groups of this period are now known collectively as the homophile movement. Popular in the 1950s and 1960s (and still in occasional use in the 1990s, particularly in writing by Anglican clergy), the term homophile was an attempt to avoid the clinical implications of sexual pathology found with the word homosexual, emphasizing love (-phile) instead. The first element of the word, the Greek root homo-, means 'same'; it is unrelated to Latin homo, 'person'. In almost all languages where the words homophile and homosexual were both in use (i.e., their cognate equivalents: German Homophil and Homosexuell, Italian omofilo and omosessuale, etc.), homosexual won out as the modern conventional neutral term. However, in Norway, the Netherlands and the Flemish/Dutch part of Belgium, the term is still widely used.

=== Same-sex attracted ===
"Same-sex attracted" or "unwanted same-sex attraction" (SSA) is a term used by some religious groups in the late 20th century as part of the ex-gay movement. According to GLAAD, the term is used, in the context of phrases such as "struggling with same-sex attraction", as part of the language of "conversion therapy". From the 2010s, it has also been used in non-religious circles, either as a non-prescriptive term to include those of different sexual orientations without naming specific labels, or heterosexual-identified men and women who have same-sex partners or same-sex attraction. The term is used in Australia as an inclusive and non-prescriptive term, defined by the Australian Government as encompassing people who are "gay, lesbian, bisexual, queer, pansexual, those who are questioning their sexual orientation, and those who are unsure".

In contrast, the LGB Alliance, a gender critical activist group, has used the phase to specify their transgender-exclusionary viewpoint (e.g. that trans women cannot be lesbians). Northern Ireland based ex-gay group X-Out-Loud works on "finding and 'helping' others 'struggle with same-sex attraction'". The group is connected to British fundamentalist group Core Issues Trust, which is described as "supporting men and women with same-sex attraction issues who voluntarily seek to change their sexual preference and expression".

The phrase came into common use through religious groups. For example, the term has been used for Catholic celibate homosexuals so as to separate individuals from a gay identity and any suggestion of approval of active homosexual relationships, while acknowledging rather than denying their orientation. John F. Harvey, a Catholic priest and moral theologian, founded Courage Apostolate in 1980 as a spiritual support group for same-sex attracted people to live according to the teachings of the Catholic Church on homosexuality. The phrase has also been used by evangelical organisations such as Evangelical Alliance to highlight that they "reject conversion therapy", but encourage "those who experience same-sex attraction" to live according to Biblical teaching (i.e. sex is only permissible within mixed-sex marriage and a rejection of same-sex marriage). In common with conservative Christian denominations, the term is also used by Mormons who use it to show a rejection of an "LGBQ identity" while acknowledging their experience.

In 2020, United Nations Independent Expert on sexual orientation and gender identity (IESOGI) published a Report on conversion therapy. Among the evidence presented, the report highlighted a 2015 US court case from New Jersey, "Ferguson v JONAH", in which a jury unanimously found the defendants guilty of fraud, claiming they were providing "services that could significantly reduce or eliminate same-sex attraction."

The Global Project Against Hate and Extremism (GPAHE) has been tracking terms related to conversion therapy online since 2022 when they published their first Conversion Therapy Online: The Ecosystem report. The report documents common terms such as "same-sex attracted" in relation to conversion therapy targeted at gay and transgender people. In January 2024, GPAHE published an updated report sharing that much work is still needed and using search terms such as "overcoming same-sex attraction" on YouTube led to results from religious and non-religious groups serving videos targeting gay and transgender people, such as videos titled "Former LGBTQers Testify: If You No Longer Want to be Gay or Transgender, You Don’t Have to Be."

A 2023 report by ILGA tracking bans on conversion therapy worldwide explains continuously changing phraseology efforts by proponents of conversion therapy to "make these pseudo-scientific practices 'a constant moving target'." The report listed a series of currently common terms used by proponents of "conversion therapy" for their "services" to provide assistance with “unwanted same-sex attraction”; promoting a “healthy sexuality”, addressing “sexual brokenness”; helping clients explore their “gender confusion”.

In 2024 a new development was reported, with social media influencers on platforms such as TikTok promoting conversion therapy by promoting ways to "stop same-sex attraction" by turning to God, using modern means such as merchandize drops, songs and memes, which has been termed "Conversion therapy 2.0".

=== Other late 19th and early 20th century sexological terms ===
- Antipathic sexual instinct: deviant sexual behavior outlined in Richard von Krafft-Ebing's Pychopathia Sexualis
- Sexual inversion
- Psychosexual hermaphroditism: bisexuality. It was believed gay men desired a female body and lesbians desired a male body. Bisexuals desired to become intersex.
- The intermediate sex: similar to sexual inversion, Edward Carpenter believed gay men possessed a male body and a female temperament and vice versa for lesbians
- Similisexualism, simulsexuality or similsexualism: homosexuality
- Intersexuality
- Catamite
- Invert
- Third sex

== Recent academic terms ==
Not all terms have been used to describe same-gender sexuality are synonyms for the modern term homosexuality. Anna Rüling, one of the first women to publicly defend gay rights, considered gay people a third gender, different from both men and women. Terms such as gynephilia and androphilia have tried to simplify the language of sexual orientation by making no claim about the individual's own gender identity. However, they are not commonly used.

=== Side ===
Side describes someone who does not practice anal sex and therefore does not define himself as top, bottom or versatile.

This term is sometimes used in American literature to present an alternative to the binary classification which notes the preferred sexual position, such as top or bottom; the term side indicates one's affinity for neither of this binary classification.

== Jargon and slang ==
A variety of LGBT slang terms have been used historically and contemporarily within the LGBT community.

In addition to the stigma surrounding homosexuality, terms have been influenced by taboos around sex in general, producing a number of euphemisms. A gay person may be described as "that way", "a bit funny", "light in his loafers", "on the bus", "batting for the other team", "a friend of Dorothy", "women who wear comfortable shoes" (lesbians), although such euphemisms are becoming less common as homosexuality becomes more visible.

Harry Hay frequently stated that, in the 1930s–1940s, gay people referred to themselves as temperamental.

=== Gay ===
As early as the 14th century, gay was a term for a lively, beautiful, or showy appearance. In the 15th century, it came to refer to a positive mood, but also was used to describe wantonness or lewdness. This eventually shifted towards a connotation of sexual promiscuity from the 17th century onwards, and then to sex work. As the various new definitions developed, the old meanings of the word remained in widespread use until the mid-20th century, when it became associated primarily with someone who is romantically or sexually attracted to someone of the same gender or sex. This sense of the word most likely developed out of the sense of hedonism or promiscuity, with which same-gender attraction was stereotypically associated, but it eventually became a preferred term within the community for self-identification and for activism. The older derogatory senses of promiscuity or sex work became rare, but later in the 20th century, gay developed a new pejorative sense: expressing the speaker's dislike or disapproval. This usage is generally considered offensive because it attaches a negative connotation to a word for a marginalized group.

== See also ==
- Terminology of transgender anatomy
