= TP63 =

Protein-coding gene in the species Homo sapiens

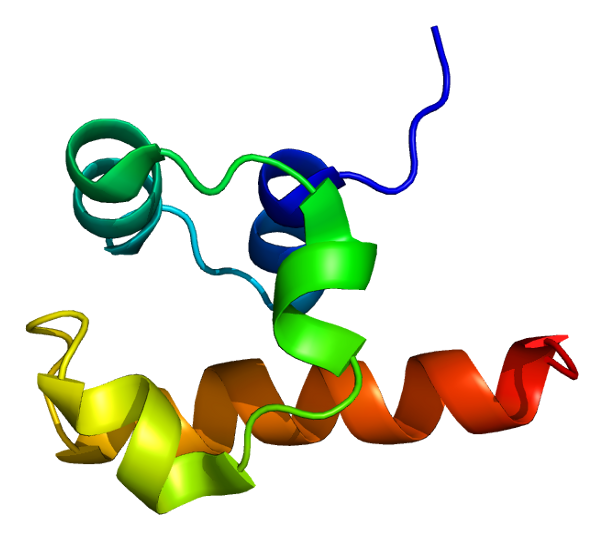

Identifiers
- Aliases: TP63, AIS, B(p51A), B(p51B), EEC3, KET, LMS, NBP, OFC8, RHS, SHFM4, TP53CP, TP53L, TP73L, p40, p51, p53CP, p63, p73H, p73L, tumor protein p63
- External IDs: OMIM: 603273; MGI: 1330810; GeneCards: TP63
Available structures
PDB	Ortholog search: PDBe RCSB
PDB	List of PDB id codes 4A9Z, 1RG6, 2RMN, 2Y9T, 2Y9U, 3QYM, 3QYN, 3US0, 3US1, 3US2, 3ZY0, 3ZY1

Gene location (Human)
Chr.	Chromosome 3 (human)
Band	3q28	Start	189,631,389 bp
Band	3q28	End	189,897,276 bp

Gene location (Mouse)
Chr.	Chromosome 16 (mouse)
Band	16 B1|16 17.37 cM	Start	25,502,513 bp
Band	16 B1|16 17.37 cM	End	25,710,852 bp
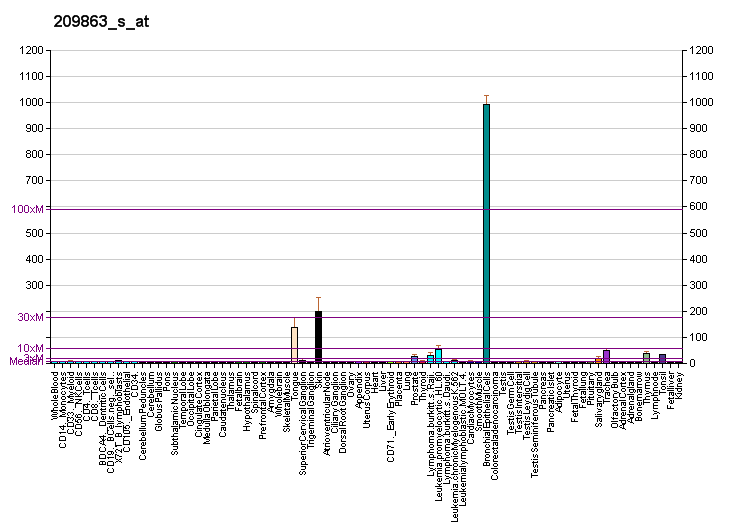

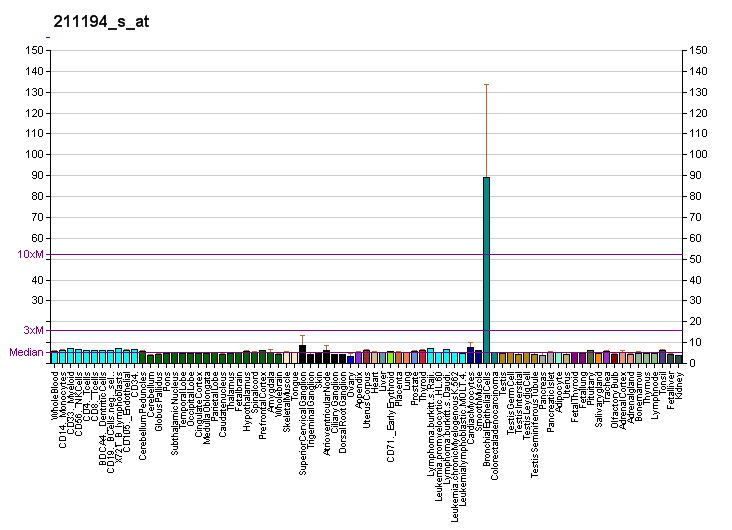

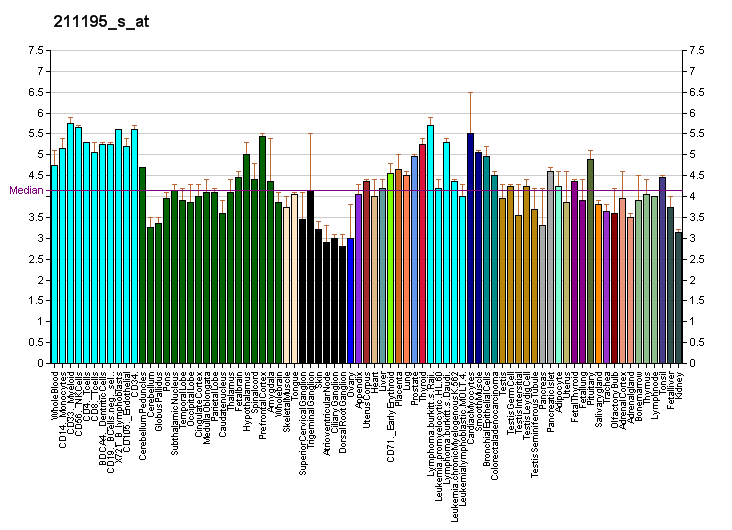
RNA expression pattern
Bgee	Human / Mouse (ortholog); Top expressed in: skin of thigh; skin of hip; skin of arm; human penis; hair follicle; vulva; gums; nipple; skin of abdomen; gingival epithelium / Top expressed in: hair follicle; molar; skin of external ear; conjunctival fornix; skin of back; transitional epithelium of urinary bladder; corneal stroma; lip; superior surface of tongue; genital tubercle; More reference expression data
BioGPS	More reference expression data
Gene ontology
Molecular function	DNA-binding transcription activator activity, RNA polymerase II-specific; metal ion binding; damaged DNA binding; protein binding; WW domain binding; double-stranded DNA binding; DNA binding; sequence-specific DNA binding; identical protein binding; chromatin binding; p53 binding; DNA-binding transcription factor activity; MDM2/MDM4 family protein binding; DNA-binding transcription factor activity, RNA polymerase II-specific; protein domain specific binding
Cellular component	cytoplasm; neuron projection; nucleus; rough endoplasmic reticulum; transcription regulator complex; nucleoplasm; dendrite; mitochondrion; Golgi apparatus; cytosol; protein-containing complex
Biological process	pattern specification process; skeletal system development; epithelial cell development; negative regulation of keratinocyte differentiation; epidermal cell division; anatomical structure formation involved in morphogenesis; prostate gland development; transcription by RNA polymerase II; squamous basal epithelial stem cell differentiation involved in prostate gland acinus development; ectoderm and mesoderm interaction; cellular response to DNA damage stimulus; female genitalia morphogenesis; odontogenesis of dentin-containing tooth; prostatic bud formation; positive regulation of cell cycle G1/S phase transition; positive regulation of mesenchymal cell proliferation; spermatogenesis; multicellular organism aging; smooth muscle tissue development; positive regulation of fibroblast apoptotic process; animal organ morphogenesis; hair follicle morphogenesis; positive regulation of Notch signaling pathway; apoptotic process; chromatin remodeling; regulation of transcription, DNA-templated; regulation of neuron apoptotic process; positive regulation of apoptotic signaling pathway; regulation of cysteine-type endopeptidase activity involved in apoptotic process; transcription, DNA-templated; embryonic limb morphogenesis; negative regulation of mesoderm development; epidermis development; post-anal tail morphogenesis; response to gamma radiation; protein homotetramerization; Notch signaling pathway; hair follicle development; neuron apoptotic process; polarized epithelial cell differentiation; proximal/distal pattern formation; cell differentiation; positive regulation of keratinocyte proliferation; skin morphogenesis; epithelial cell differentiation; urinary bladder development; cellular response to UV; establishment of planar polarity; negative regulation of apoptotic process; negative regulation of transcription by RNA polymerase II; protein tetramerization; keratinocyte proliferation; positive regulation of osteoblast differentiation; regulation of epidermal cell division; negative regulation of transcription, DNA-templated; negative regulation of cellular senescence; intrinsic apoptotic signaling pathway in response to DNA damage by p53 class mediator; sympathetic nervous system development; establishment of skin barrier; morphogenesis of a polarized epithelium; keratinocyte differentiation; multicellular organism development; mitotic G1 DNA damage checkpoint signaling; cloacal septation; response to X-ray; positive regulation of transcription by RNA polymerase II; DNA damage response, signal transduction by p53 class mediator resulting in transcription of p21 class mediator; positive regulation of protein insertion into mitochondrial membrane involved in apoptotic signaling pathway; regulation of signal transduction by p53 class mediator; regulation of apoptotic process; ageing; negative regulation of intracellular estrogen receptor signaling pathway; positive regulation of transcription, DNA-templated; positive regulation of somatic stem cell population maintenance; cell population proliferation; epidermal cell differentiation; embryonic forelimb morphogenesis; embryonic hindlimb morphogenesis; skin epidermis development; cranial skeletal system development; developmental process
Sources:Amigo / QuickGO
Orthologs
Databases	NCBI: entry; OMA: entry
Species	Human	Mouse
Entrez	8626	22061
Ensembl	ENSG00000073282	ENSMUSG00000022510
UniProt	Q9H3D4	O88898
RefSeq (mRNA)	NM_001114978; NM_001114979; NM_001114980; NM_001114981; NM_001114982 NM_003722; NM_001329144; NM_001329145; NM_001329146; NM_001329148; NM_001329149; NM_001329150; NM_001329964	NM_001127259; NM_001127260; NM_001127261; NM_001127262; NM_001127263 NM_001127264; NM_001127265; NM_011641
RefSeq (protein)	NP_001108450; NP_001108451; NP_001108452; NP_001108453; NP_001108454 NP_001316073; NP_001316074; NP_001316075; NP_001316077; NP_001316078; NP_001316079; NP_001316893; NP_003713	NP_001120731; NP_001120732; NP_001120733; NP_001120734; NP_001120735 NP_001120736; NP_001120737; NP_035771
Location (UCSC)	Chr 3: 189.63 – 189.9 Mb	Chr 16: 25.5 – 25.71 Mb
PubMed search
- Wikidata
View/Edit Human	View/Edit Mouse

Tumor protein p63, typically referred to as p63, also known as transformation-related protein 63, is a protein that in humans is encoded by the TP63 (also known as the p63) gene.

The TP63 gene was discovered 20 years after the discovery of the p53 tumor suppressor gene and along with p73 constitutes the p53 gene family based on their structural similarity. Despite being discovered significantly later than p53, phylogenetic analysis of p53, p63 and p73, suggest that p63 was the original member of the family from which p53 and p73 evolved.

== Function ==
Tumor protein p63 is a member of the p53 family of transcription factors. p63 -/- mice have several developmental defects which include the lack of limbs and other tissues, such as teeth and mammary glands, which develop as a result of interactions between mesenchyme and epithelium. TP63 encodes for two main isoforms by alternative promoters (TAp63 and ΔNp63). ΔNp63 is involved in multiple functions during skin development and in adult stem/progenitor cell regulation. In contrast, TAp63 has been mostly restricted to its apoptotic function and more recently as the guardian of oocyte integrity. Recently, two new functions have been attributed to TAp63 in heart development and premature aging.

In mice, p63 is required for normal skin development via direct transcription of the membrane protein PERP. TP63 can also regulate PERP expression with TP53 in human cancer.

=== Oocyte integrity ===
In oocytes, a unique quality control system has evolved that eliminates by apoptosis those oocytes in which chromosomes do not align correctly, or in which chromosomes cannot be repaired. This monitoring system is conserved from fruit flies and nematodes to humans, and central to this system is the p53 protein family and, in vertebrates in particular, the p63 protein. Oocytes that are unable to repair DNA double-strand breaks produced during meiosis by the process of homologous recombination are eliminated by apoptosis that is linked to p63.

== Clinical significance ==
At least 42 disease-causing mutations in this gene have been discovered. TP63 mutations underlie several malformation syndromes that include cleft lip and/or palate as a hallmark feature. Mutations in the TP63 gene are associated with ectrodactyly-ectodermal dysplasia-cleft syndrome in which a midline cleft lip is a common feature, cleft lip/palate syndrome 3 (EEC3); ectrodactyly (also known as split-hand/foot malformation 4 (SHFM4)); ankyloblepharon-ectodermal dysplasia-cleft lip/palate (AEC) or Hay–Wells syndrome in which a midline cleft lip is also a common feature, Acro–dermato–ungual–lacrimal–tooth syndrome (ADULT); limb-mammary syndrome; Rap-Hodgkin syndrome (RHS); and orofacial cleft 8.

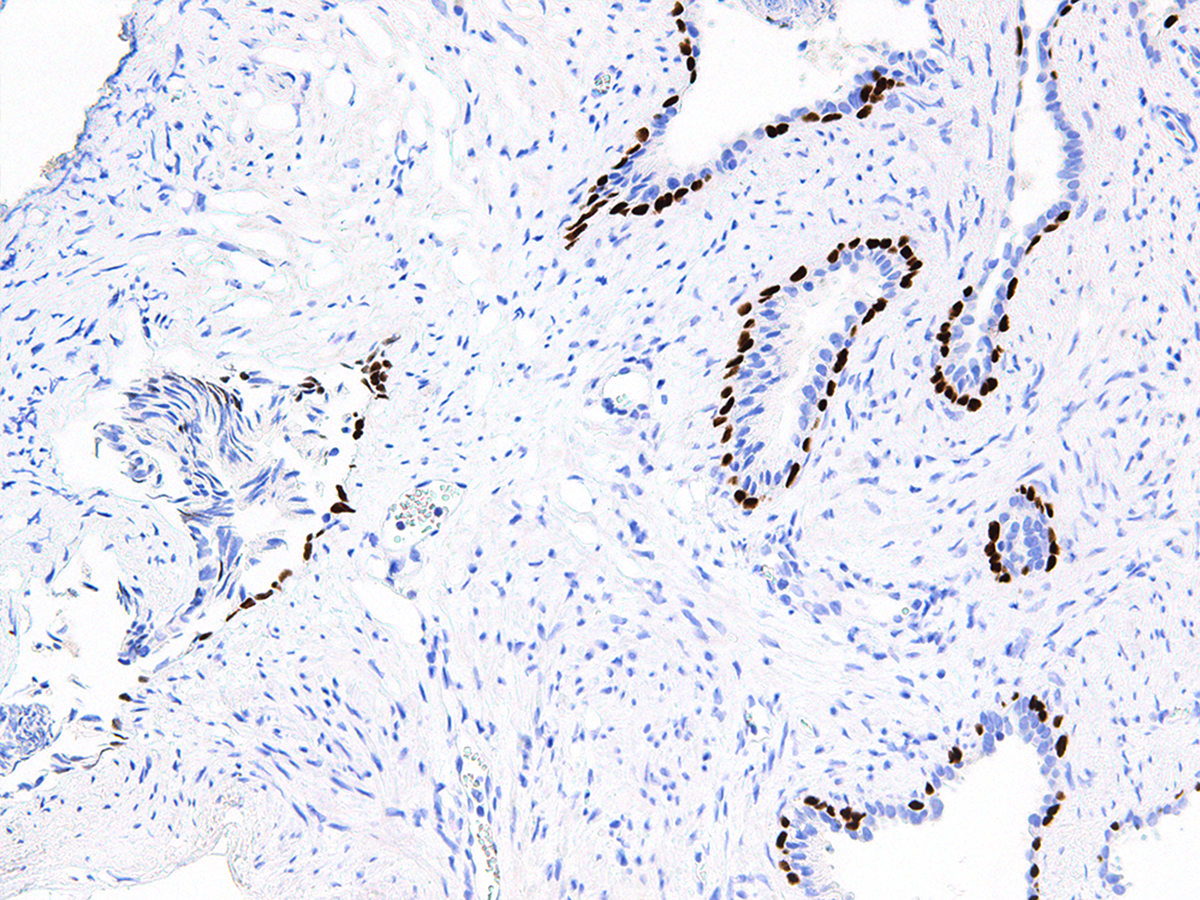
p63 staining on prostate cancer tissue using antibody clone IHC063

Both cleft lip with or without a cleft palate and cleft palate only features have been seen to segregate within the same family with a TP63 mutation. Recently, induced pluripotent stem cells have been produced from patients affected by EEC syndromes by cell reprogramming. The defective epithelial commitment could be partially rescued by a small therapeutic compound.

== Molecular mechanism ==
Transcription factor p63 is a key regulator of epidermal keratinocyte proliferation and differentiation. In a recent study, researchers used EEC-patient-derived skin keratinocytes carrying heterozygous p63 DNA-binding domain mutations as the cellular model to characterize the global gene regulatory alteration. The epidermal cell identity was compromised in p63 mutant keratinocytes. Besides, p63-binding loss and loss of active enhancers occurs at a genome-wide scale in patient keratinocytes carrying heterozygous EEC mutations. Besides, using a multi-omics approach, the deregulated function of DNA loops mediated by p63 and CTCF represents an additional layer to the disease mechanism. It seems that a number of loci nearby epidermal genes were organized into a 'regulatory chromatin hub' within the chromatin interactions, mediated by CTCF in epidermal keratinocytes. Such hubs contain multiple connecting DNA loops that require not only CTCF binding that is rather static but also binding of cell type-specific TFs, like p63, for the transcriptional activity. In this model, p63 may be essential to make the DNA loops active in transcription.

=== Vulvar cancer ===
TP63 has been observed overexpressed in Vulvar Squamous Cell Carcinoma samples, in association with hypermethylation-Induced inactivation of the IRF6 tumor suppressor gene. Indeed, mRNA levels of TP63 tested higher in Vulvar cancer samples when compared with those of normal skin and preneoplastic vulvar lesions, thus underscoring an epigenetic cross-link between IRF6 gene and the oncogene TP63.

== Diagnostic utility ==
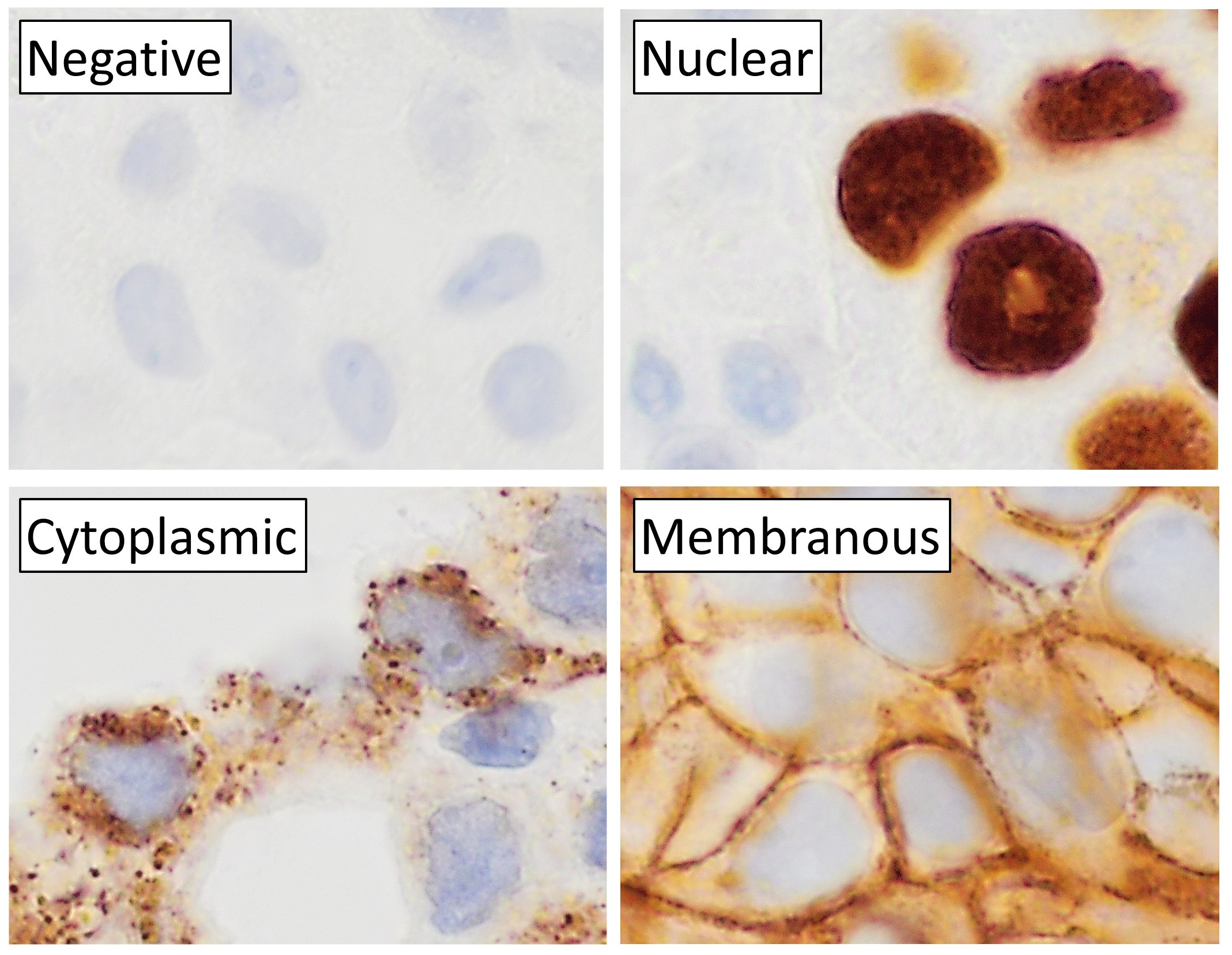
Main staining patterns on chromogenic immunohistochemistry.

p63 immunostaining has utility for head and neck squamous cell carcinomas, differentiating prostatic adenocarcinoma (the most common type of prostate cancer) and benign prostatic tissue; the nuclei of the basal cells of normal prostatic glands stain with p63, while the malignant glands in prostatic adenocarcinoma (which lacks these cells) do not. P63 is also helpful in distinguishing poorly differentiated squamous cell carcinoma from small cell carcinoma or adenocarcinoma. P63 should be strongly stained in poorly differentiated squamous cell, but negative in small cell or adenocarcinoma.

Cytoplasmic staining on immunohistochemistry is seen in cells with muscle differentiation.

== Interactions ==
TP63 has been shown to interact with HNRPAB. It also activates IRF6 transcription through the IRF6 enhancer element.

== Regulation ==
There is some evidence that the expression of p63 is regulated by the microRNA miR-203 and USP28 at protein level

== See also ==
- AMACR - another marker for prostate adenocarcinoma
