= LINKED syndrome =

- Other names: LINKage-specific-deubiquitylation-deficiency-induced embryonic defects syndrome
- Specialty: Medical genetics, Neurology
- Symptoms: Developmental delay, craniofacial abnormalities, brain malformations, intellectual disability
- Complications: Neurological deterioration
- Usual onset: At conception
- Causes: Mutations in the OTUD5 gene
- Risk factors: Male sex
- Diagnostic method: Genetic testing, brain imaging
- Management: Physical therapy, occupational therapy, speech therapy, surgery

LINKED syndrome, or LINKage-specific-deubiquitylation-deficiency-induced embryonic defects syndrome, is a rare X-linked genetic disorder caused by mutations in the OTUD5 gene. First discovered in 2021 by NIH researchers, this genetic disorder affects mostly male patients and disrupts embryonic developmental processes (block early growth) which results in critical developmental deficits of the brain paired with facial abnormalities. Diagnosis relies on clinical evaluation, genetic testing (whole-exome sequencing), and brain imaging (MRI). The discovery revealed that OTUD5-mediated deubiquitylation is essential for early brain and facial development, advancing understanding of embryonic growth and genetic regulation. While no cure is available currently, management focuses on supportive care which includes physical therapy alongside occupational therapy. The condition is extremely rare, with only a few dozen cases reported worldwide as of 2025.

== Symptoms and signs ==
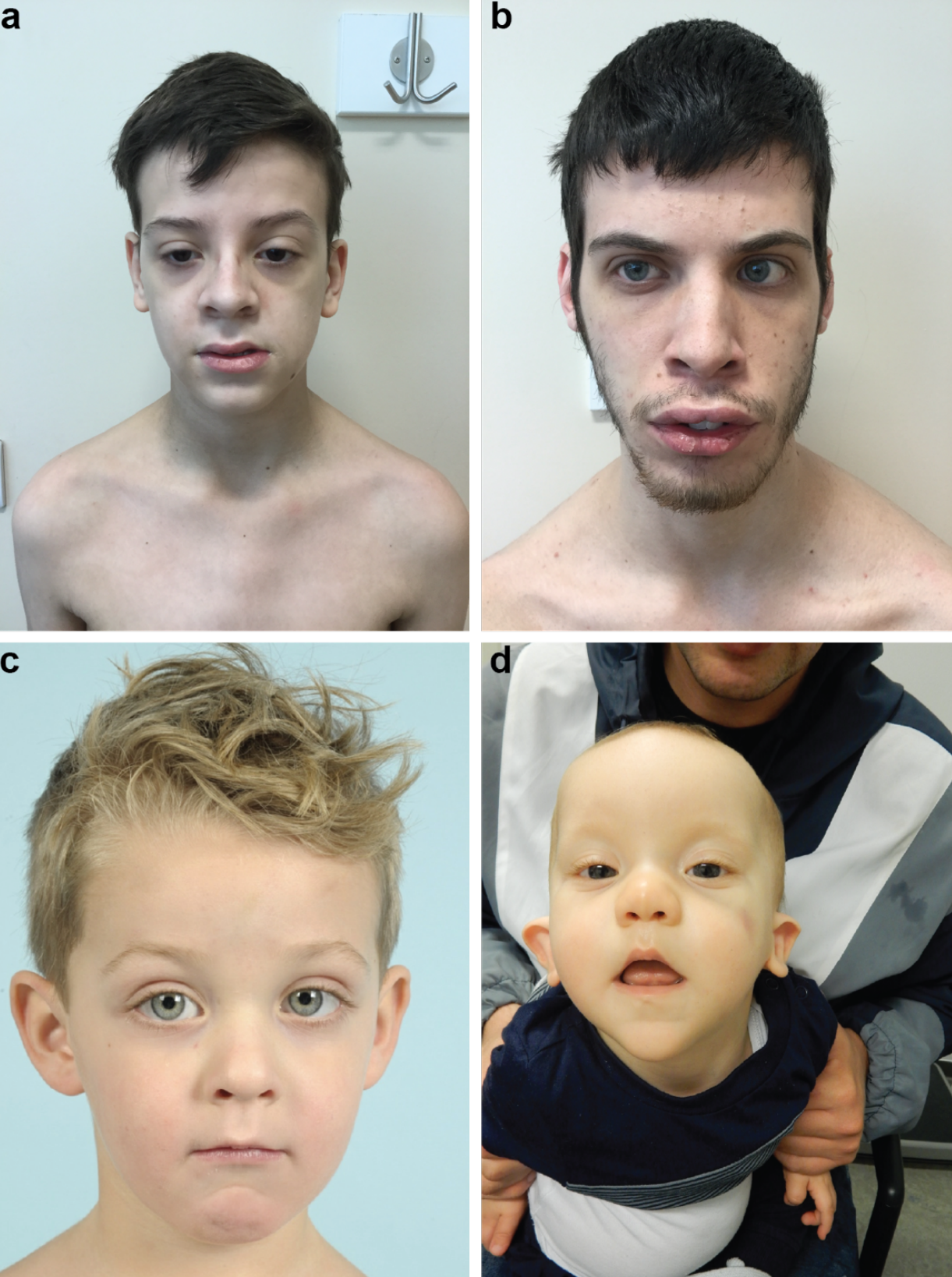
Patients with craniofacial features

The neurological manifestations of LINKED syndrome include delayed development combined with anomalies of brain anatomy and facial structures because of developmental harm to the neuroectoderm. These developmental deficits can lead to challenges such as delayed speech, difficulty walking, and impaired cognitive skills. Brain malformations, detectable by MRI, include abnormal gyration patterns and cortical thinning effects (brain differences) that develop from mutations affecting embryonic gene expression.

The developmental errors that cause craniofacial anomalies produce distinct facial characteristics with characteristics such as eyes widely spaced and pronounced foreheads and misaligned jaws. The essential symptoms outlined in the 2021 Science Advances study has real consequences for patient everyday functioning.

Symptoms of LINKED syndrome vary in severity, ranging from severe intellectual disability and significant facial abnormalities to milder developmental delays and physical traits. Affected individuals may experience a spectrum of neurological impairments, from profound deficits to minor issues, alongside diverse craniofacial features.

The diverse range of symptoms in LINKED syndrome patients may result from OTUD5 mutation types because missense variants lead to partial dysfunction yet truncations might completely destroy enzyme function.

=== Associated Conditions ===
LINKED syndrome may occasionally involve secondary issues tied to its developmental origins, such as neurological deterioration. Research on hearing and vision problems associated with neuroectodermal development remains insufficient due to lack of supporting evidence despite potential links between sensory organ formation and the affected domain. Unlike multi-system disorders like Cornelia de Lange syndrome, LINKED syndrome affects both neurological structures and craniofacial regions exclusively.

== Causes ==
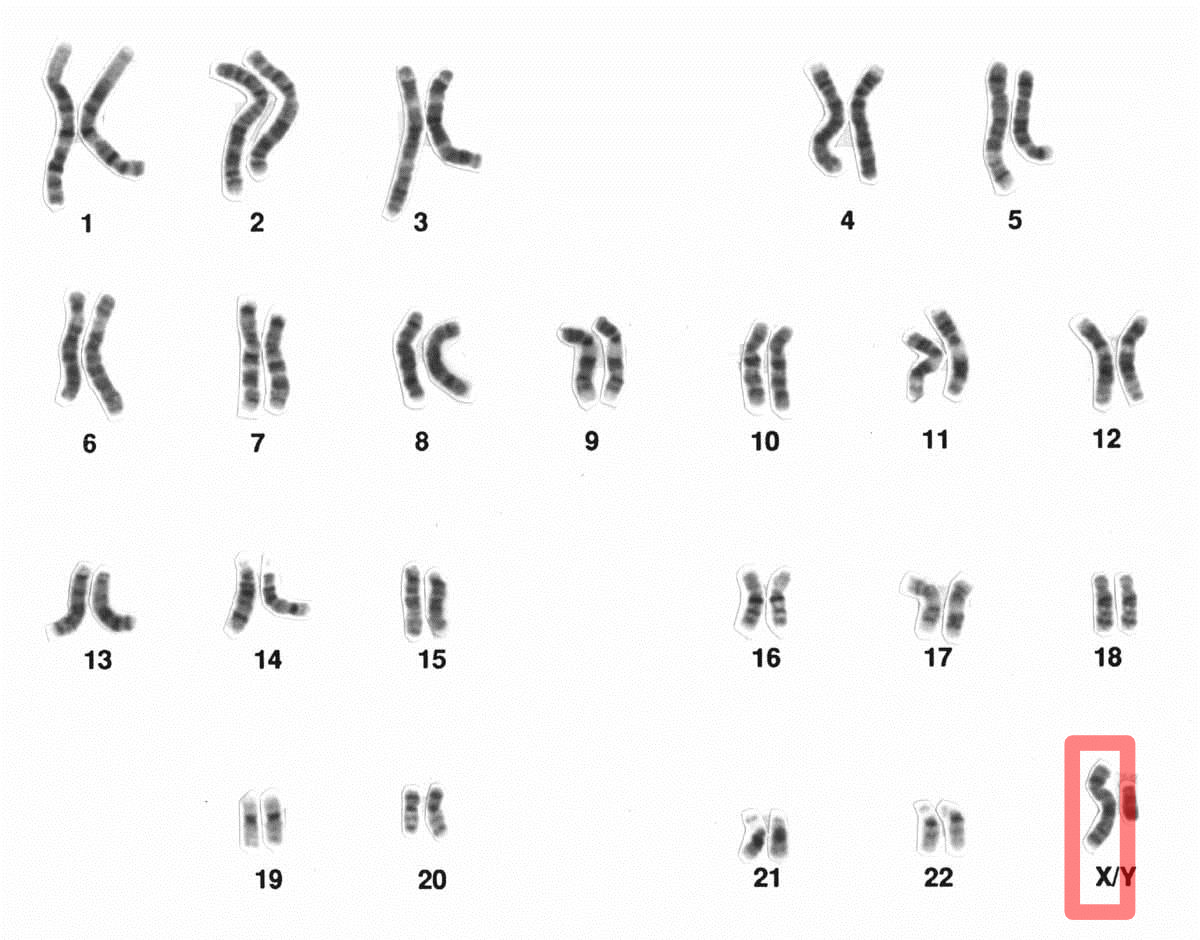
X-Chromosome in male

The primary cause of LINKED syndrome is mutations in the OTUD5 gene, which encodes a deubiquitinating enzyme essential for regulating protein stability during embryogenesis, named Otu Deubiquitinase 5. Different distinct hemizygous mutations, mutations which makes an individual has only one member of a chromosome pair or chromosome segment rather than the usual two, are found, including missense mutation (e.g., E200K, G494S, L352P, R274W, R404W), a splice site mutation, and an in-frame deletion. These variants are under Multiple Congenital Anomalies-Neurodevelopmental Syndrome, linking them to this disorder.

When the mutated OTUD5 gene is inherited, males, with one X chromosome, are primarily affected by this syndrome as it has a X-linked recessive inheritance pattern. While for females, they are less likely to get the syndrome as they got two X chromosomes, making the recessive gene harder to express.

== Mechanism ==
LINKED syndrome stems from mutations in the OTUD5 gene, which directs production of an enzyme, OTU Deubiquitinase 5. This enzyme takes off ubiquitin tags, protein markers of being removed, from specific proteins, especially chromatin remodelers (proteins that unpack DNA). These remodelers promote the turning on of genes for early growth. This tag removal is blocked by mutations in OTUD5 and this prevents healthy gene activation required for development.

OTUD5 mutations disrupt neural precursors (cells that develop into the brain and spinal cord) and neural crest cells (cells forming facial bones, heart tissue, and other structures). Without proper gene control, these cells grow abnormally and show the brain differences characteristic of LINKED syndrome, such as a thin corpus callosum (fewer nerve connections) or abnormal gyration (irregular brain folds). In some cases, rare heart defects, along with facial features like widely spaced eyes, pronounced foreheads and misaligned jaws also occur. This faulty cell development represents a key growth pathway with genes identical to those seen in syndromes like Coffin-Siris and Cornelia de Lange.

== Diagnosis ==
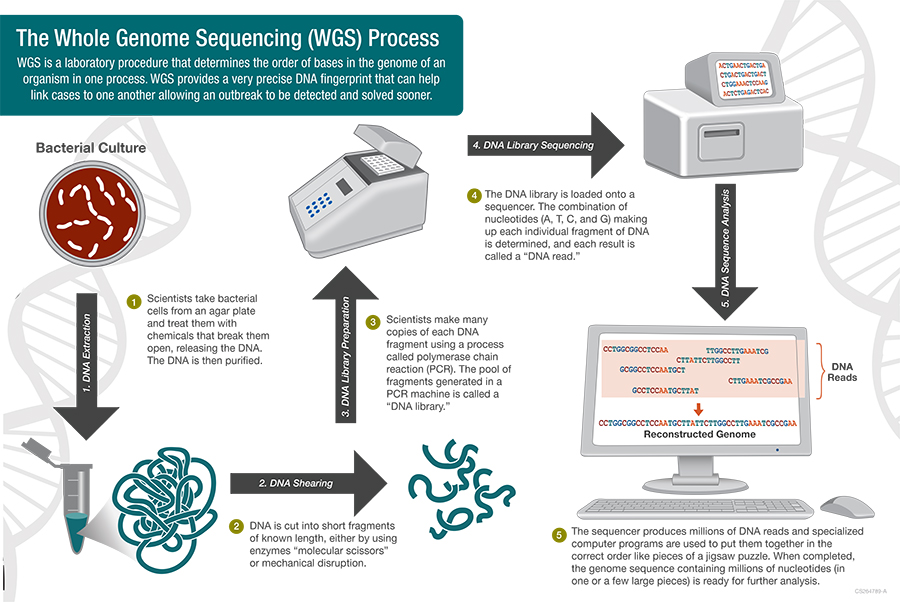
Whole genome sequencing process

=== Clinical evaluation ===
As males have X-linked recessive inheritance, clinical evaluation often starts with checking features commonly seen in males. Those features include developmental delays, hypotonia, intellectual disability and craniofacial anomalies including telecanthus and epicanthic fold. Also, thin corpus callosum or ventriculomegaly, kinds of brain malformations are also often noticed. These symptoms are often observed in male infants or children with neurodevelopmental disorder and birth defect.

=== Genetic test ===
To diagnosis LINKED syndrome, OTUD5 gene mutation needs to be detected, as it is the cause of the syndrome. To detect the mutation, whole exome sequencing or whole genome sequencing are often performed, to find out the mutation on X chromosome at Xp11.23, confirmed by Sanger sequencing for variants like E200K or R404W. To increase the diagnositic accuracy, brain imaging can be conducted to show structural abnormalities that are different from clinical findings.

== Screening ==
Prenatal testing is also possible in a family with a known history as this disease is a genetic disorder, such that they could be inherit to the offsprings. The testing could also be done when there is abnormalities during ultrasonography. This approach allow early detection of the syndrome, reducing the risk of passing the gene to the offspring.

== Management ==
Currently, no specific treatment exists for LINKED syndrome, a rare genetic disorder caused by OTUD5 gene mutations, identified in 2021. Management centers on supportive care tailored to symptoms, primarily developmental delays, brain malformations, and craniofacial anomalies prevalent in affected males. Multidisciplinary strategies aim to enhance quality of life.

=== Therapeutic approaches ===
Physical therapy and occupational therapy address hypotonia and motor skill deficits, while speech therapy targets communication difficulties linked to intellectual disability. Individualized educational programs support cognitive and developmental progress.

=== Surgical interventions ===
Surgical intervention may be considered for congenital anomalies, such as craniofacial defects, depending on clinical severity, as suggested by early descriptions of the condition. Brain imaging, such as magnetic resonance imaging, monitors structural abnormalities like a thin corpus callosum or ventriculomegaly, guiding care adjustments. Seizures, if present, are managed with standard antiepileptic medications, tailored to individual response.

== Epidemiology ==
The prevalence of LINKED syndrome remains uncertain because of its recent identification in 2021 and limited reporting. The Science Advances study documented 10 cases within a limited number of patients which indicates an extremely low prevalence rate. Early research suggests it is exceptionally rare, but underdiagnosis is likely because its symptoms resemble other neurodevelopmental disorders, and genetic testing for OTUD5 mutations is not yet standard.

Reports of cases of the syndrome in the U.S. have been reported geographically scattered, and the first diagnoses were in unrelated families identified via NIH research programs.

== History ==
The discovery of LINKED syndrome occurred in 2021 through a group of NIH researchers who published their findings in Science Advances on January 20, 2021. The study examined 10 male patients who had OTUD5 gene mutations that caused developmental defects. Using whole-exome sequencing and cellular models, the team demonstrated that OTUD5's deubiquitinase activity is essential for embryonic neuroectodermal differentiation. The discovery established LINKED syndrome as a new X-linked condition that received its name from its unique method of ubiquitin cleavage.

LINKED syndrome became established as a separate medical condition when OMIM made its first entry for OTUD5 (ID: 300713) in late 2021.

While no major follow-up studies emerged by early 2025, the disorder's inclusion in NCBI Gene and rare disease discussions reflects growing awareness.

== Research directions ==
Efforts are underway to expand the known phenotypic range, given the variability observed in affected males, from severe prenatal anomalies to milder presentations in adulthood. Research also examines prenatal manifestations, such as hydrocephalus, to improve early detection methods.

Long-term studies aim to assess outcomes and refine management strategies, leveraging advances in genomic technologies to address this recently discovered condition.
