= ADULT syndrome =

Rare human genetic disease

Acro–dermato–ungual–lacrimal–tooth syndrome
- Other names: ADULT syndrome
- Acro–dermato–ungual–lacrimal–tooth syndrome has an autosomal dominant form of inheritance.
- Specialty: Medical genetics

Acro–dermato–ungual–lacrimal–tooth syndrome (ADULT syndrome) is a rare genetic disease. It is an autosomal dominant form of ectodermal dysplasia, a group of disorders that affects the hair, teeth, nails, sweat glands, and extremities. The syndrome arises from a mutation in the TP63 gene. This disease was previously thought to be a form of ectrodactyly–ectodermal dysplasia–cleft syndrome (EEC), but was classified as a different disease in 1993 by Propping and Zerres.

== Signs and symptoms ==
The age of onset for ADULT syndrome is generally either at a prenatal age or before a newborn reaches 4 weeks old. ADULT syndrome features include ectrodactyly, syndactyly, excessive freckling, lacrimal duct anomalies, dysplastic nails, hypodontia, hypoplastic breasts and nipples, hypotrichosis, hypohidrosis, broad nasal bridge, midfacial hypoplasia, exfoliative dermatitis, and xerosis. The lack of facial clefting and ankyloblepharon are important because they exist in ectrodactyly–ectodermal dysplasia–cleft syndrome (EEC) but not in ADULT syndrome.

Patients with ADULT syndrome may also experience nail abnormalities, fine or thinned hair, fingernail or toenail dysplasia, melanocytic nevus, nail pits, skin ulcers, and thin skin.

== Cause ==
ADULT syndrome is due to autosomal dominant mutations of the TP63 gene, which encodes the p63 protein. TP63 mutations cause deformities because the p63 protein is critical in the embryonic development of limbs and other ectodermal tissues. Seven mutations have been found, the most common of which are R298Q and R243W, in which encoding for arginine is changed to glutamine at position 298 and tryptophan at position 243, respectively. Other p63 genes mutation syndromes include ectrodactyly–ectodermal dysplasia–cleft syndrome (EEC) and Hay-Wells syndromes.
