= Dactyly =

Arrangement of digits on hands and feet

Human hand anatomy (pentadactyl)

In biology, dactyly is the arrangement of digits (fingers and toes) on the hands, feet, or sometimes wings of a tetrapod animal. The term is derived from the Ancient Greek word δάκτυλος (dáktulos), meaning "finger."

Sometimes the suffix "-dactylia" is used. The derived adjectives end with "-dactyl" or "-dactylous."

== As a normal feature ==
=== Pentadactyly ===
Pentadactyly (from Ancient Greek πέντε (pénte), meaning "five") is the condition of having five digits on each limb. It is traditionally believed that all living tetrapods are descended from an ancestor with a pentadactyl limb, although many species have now lost or transformed some or all of their digits by the process of evolution. However, this viewpoint was challenged by Stephen Jay Gould in his 1991 essay "Eight (or Fewer) Little Piggies," where he pointed out polydactyly in early tetrapods and described the specializations of digit reduction. Despite the individual variations listed below, the relationship is to the original five-digit model.

In reptiles, the limbs are pentadactylous.

Dogs have tetradactylous paws but the dewclaw makes them pentadactyls. Cats also have dewclaws on their front limbs but not their hind limbs, making them both pentadactyls and tetradactyls.

=== Tetradactyly ===
Tetradactyly (from Ancient Greek τετρα- (tetra-), meaning "four") is the condition of having four digits on a limb, as in many birds, amphibians, and theropod dinosaurs.

=== Tridactyly ===
Tridactylous Allosaurus arm

Tridactyly (from Ancient Greek τρι- (trí-), meaning "three") is the condition of having three digits on a limb, as in the rhinoceros and ancestors of the horse such as Protohippus and Hipparion. These all belong to the Perissodactyla. Some birds also have three toes, including emus, bustards, and quail.

=== Didactyly ===
Didactyly (from Ancient Greek δι- (di-), meaning "two") or bidactyly is the condition of having two digits on each limb, as in the Hypertragulidae and two-toed sloth, Choloepus didactylus. In humans this name is used for an abnormality in which the middle digits are missing, leaving only the thumb and fifth finger, or big and little toes. Cloven-hoofed mammals (such as deer, sheep and cattle – Artiodactyla) have only two digits, as do ostriches.

=== Monodactyly ===
Monodactyly (from Ancient Greek μόνος (mónos), meaning "one") is the condition of having a single digit on a limb, as in modern horses and other equids (though one study suggests that the frog might be composed of remnants of digits II and IV, rendering horses not truly monodactyl) as well as sthenurine kangaroos. Functional monodactyly, where the weight is supported on only one of multiple toes, can also occur, as in the theropod dinosaur Vespersaurus. The pterosaur Nyctosaurus retained only the wing finger on the forelimb, rendering it also partially monodactyl.

== As a congenital defect ==
Among humans, the term "five-fingered hand" is sometimes used to mean the abnormality of having five fingers, none of which is a thumb.

=== Syndactyly ===
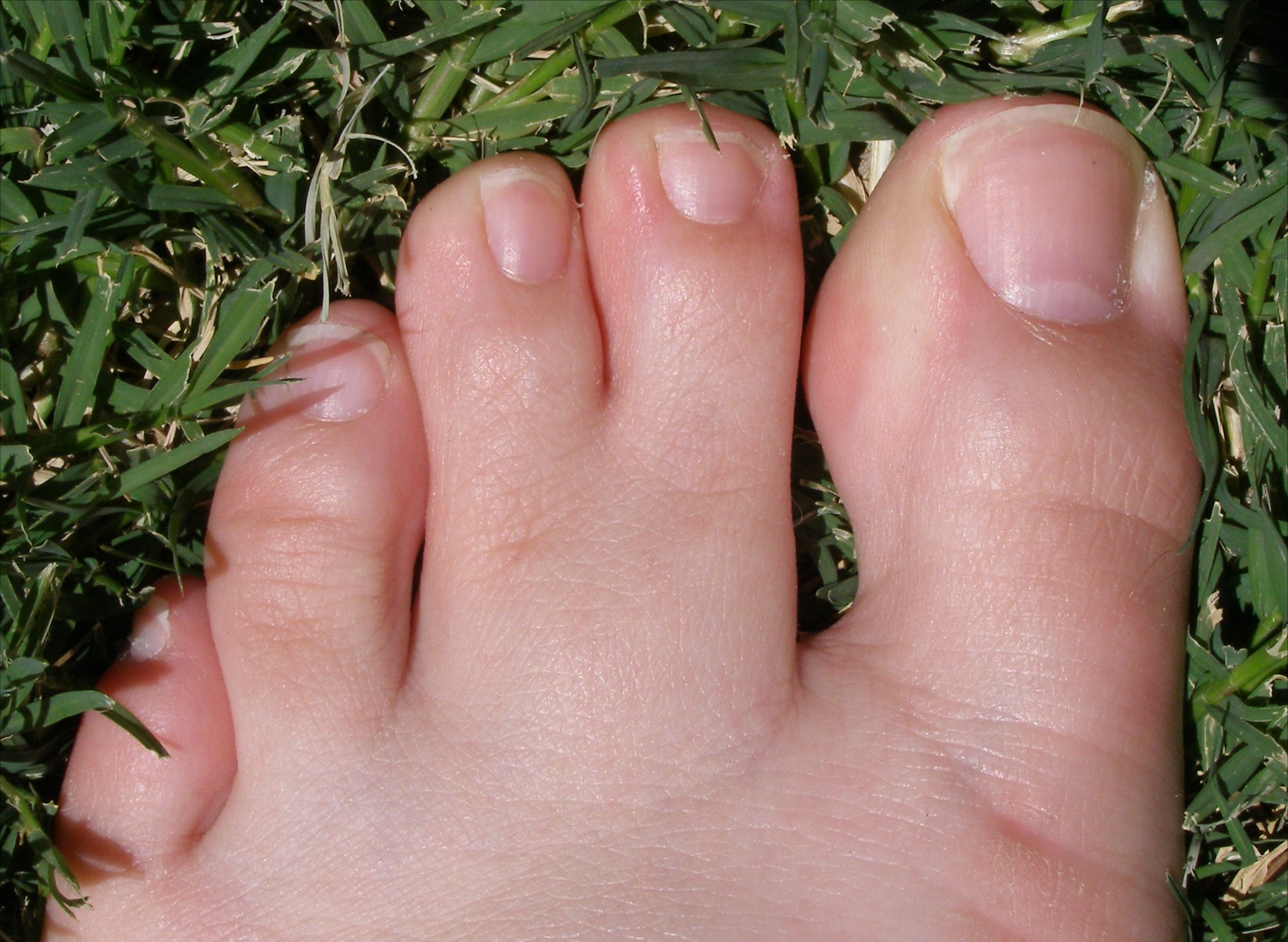
Human foot with partial simple syndactyly.

Syndactyly (from Ancient Greek σύν (sún), meaning "together") is a condition where two or more digits are fused together. It occurs normally in some mammals, such as the siamang and most diprotodontid marsupials such as kangaroos. It occurs as an unusual condition in humans.

=== Polydactyly ===
Polydactyly (from Ancient Greek πολύς (polús), meaning "many") is when a limb has more than the usual number of digits. This can be:

- As a result of congenital abnormality in a normally pentadactyl animal. Polydactyly is very common among domestic cats. For more information, see polydactyly.
- Polydactyly in early tetrapod aquatic animals, such as in Acanthostega gunnari (Jarvik 1952), one of an increasing number of genera of stem-tetrapods known from the Upper Devonian, which are providing insights into the appearance of tetrapods and the origin of limbs with digits. It also occurs secondarily in some later tetrapods, such as ichthyosaurs. The use of a term normally reserved for congenital defects reflects that it was regarded as an anomaly at the time, as it was believed that all modern tetrapods have either five digits or ancestors that did.

=== Oligodactyly ===
Oligodactyly (from Greek ὀλίγος (olígos), meaning "few") is having too few digits when not caused by an amputation. It is sometimes incorrectly called hypodactyly or confused with aphalangia, the absence of the phalanx bone on one or (commonly) more digits. When all the digits on a hand or foot are absent, it is referred to as adactyly.

==== Ectrodactyly ====
Ectrodactyly, also known as split-hand malformation, is the congenital absence of one or more central digits of the hands and feet. Consequently, it is a form of oligodactyly. News anchor Bree Walker is probably the best-known person with this condition, which affects about one in 91,000 people. It is conspicuously more common in the Vadoma in Zimbabwe.

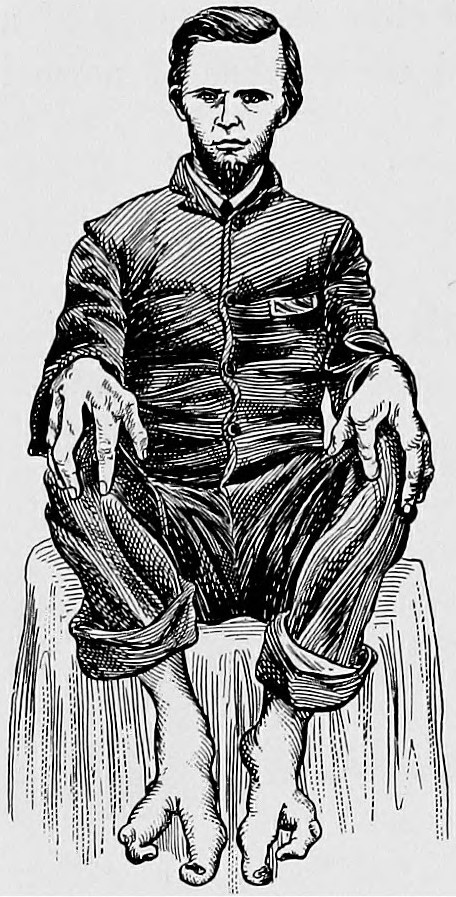
Tetradactyly

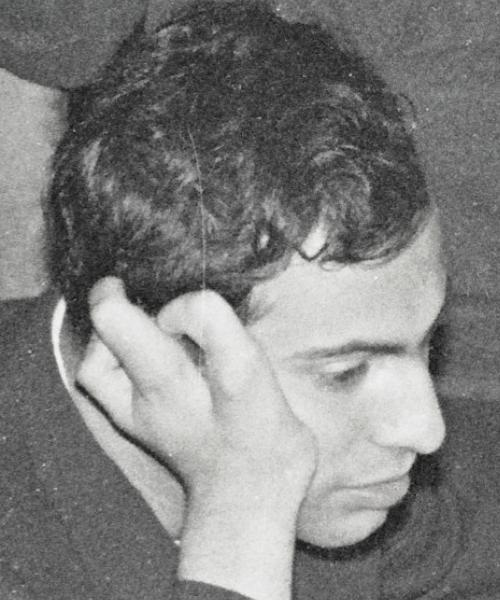
Tridactyly (Mikhail Tal)

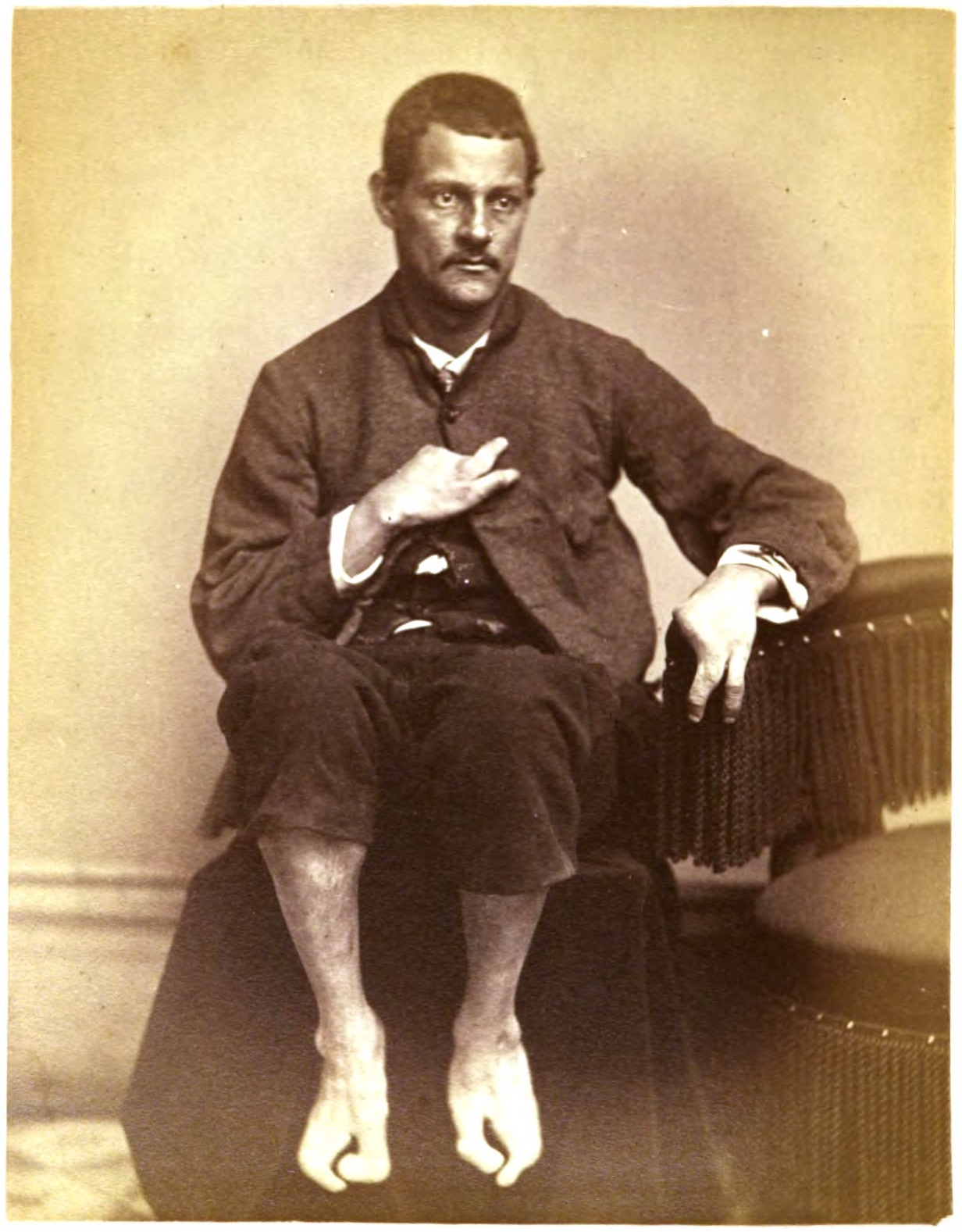
Didactyly

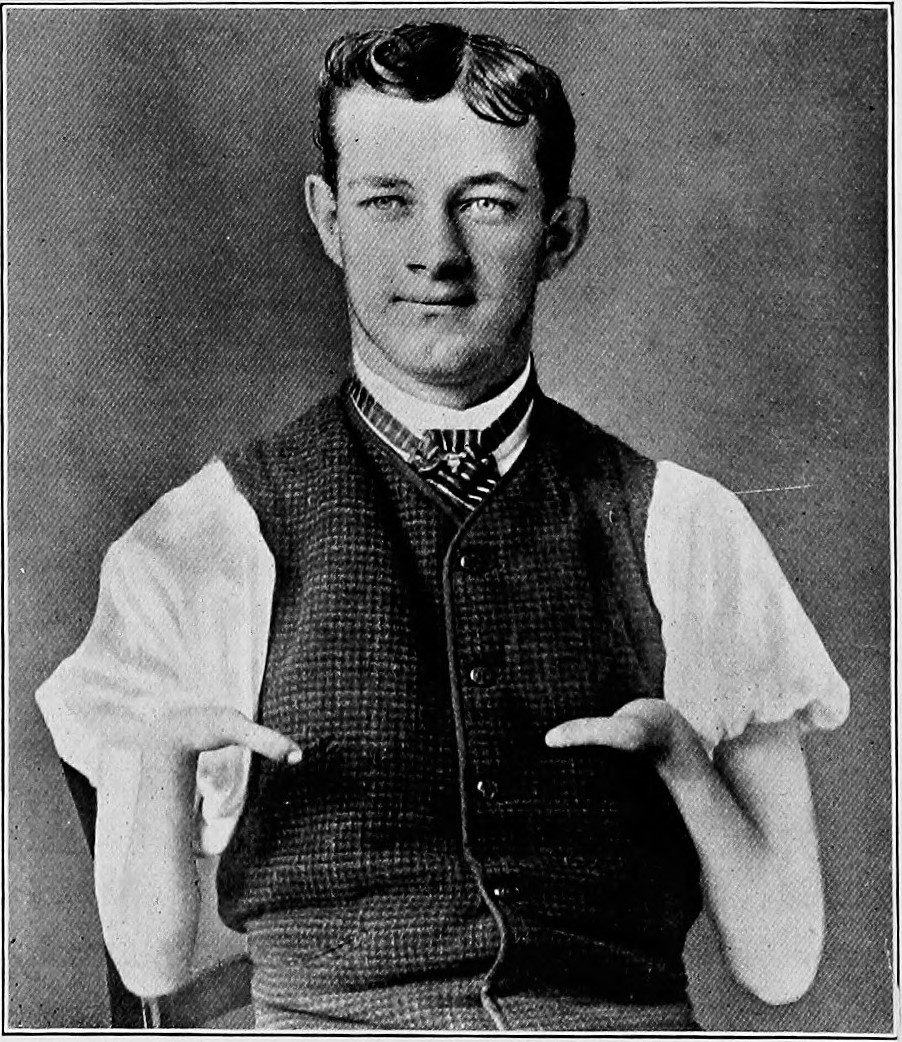
Monodactyly

=== Clinodactyly ===
Clinodactyly is a medical term describing the curvature of a digit (a finger or toe) in the plane of the palm, most commonly the fifth finger (the "little finger") towards the adjacent fourth finger (the "ring finger"). It is a fairly common isolated anomaly which often goes unnoticed, but also occurs in combination with other abnormalities in certain genetic syndromes, such as Down syndrome, Turner syndrome and Cornelia de Lange syndrome.

== In birds ==
Four types of bird feet (right foot from above, top is front)

=== Anisodactyly ===
Anisodactyly is the most common arrangement of digits in birds, with three toes forward and one back. This is common in songbirds and other perching birds, as well as hunting birds such as eagles, hawks, and falcons. This arrangement of digits helps with perching and/or climbing and clinging. This occurs in Passeriformes, Columbiformes, Falconiformes, Accipitriformes, Galliformes and a majority of other birds.

=== Syndactyly ===
Syndactyly, as it occurs in birds, is like anisodactyly, except that the third and fourth toes (the outer and middle forward-pointing toes), or three toes, are fused together almost to their claws, as in the belted kingfisher (Megaceryle alcyon). This is often found in Picocoraciae, though rollers, ground rollers, and Piciformes (who are zygodactyl) are exceptions.

=== Zygodactyly ===
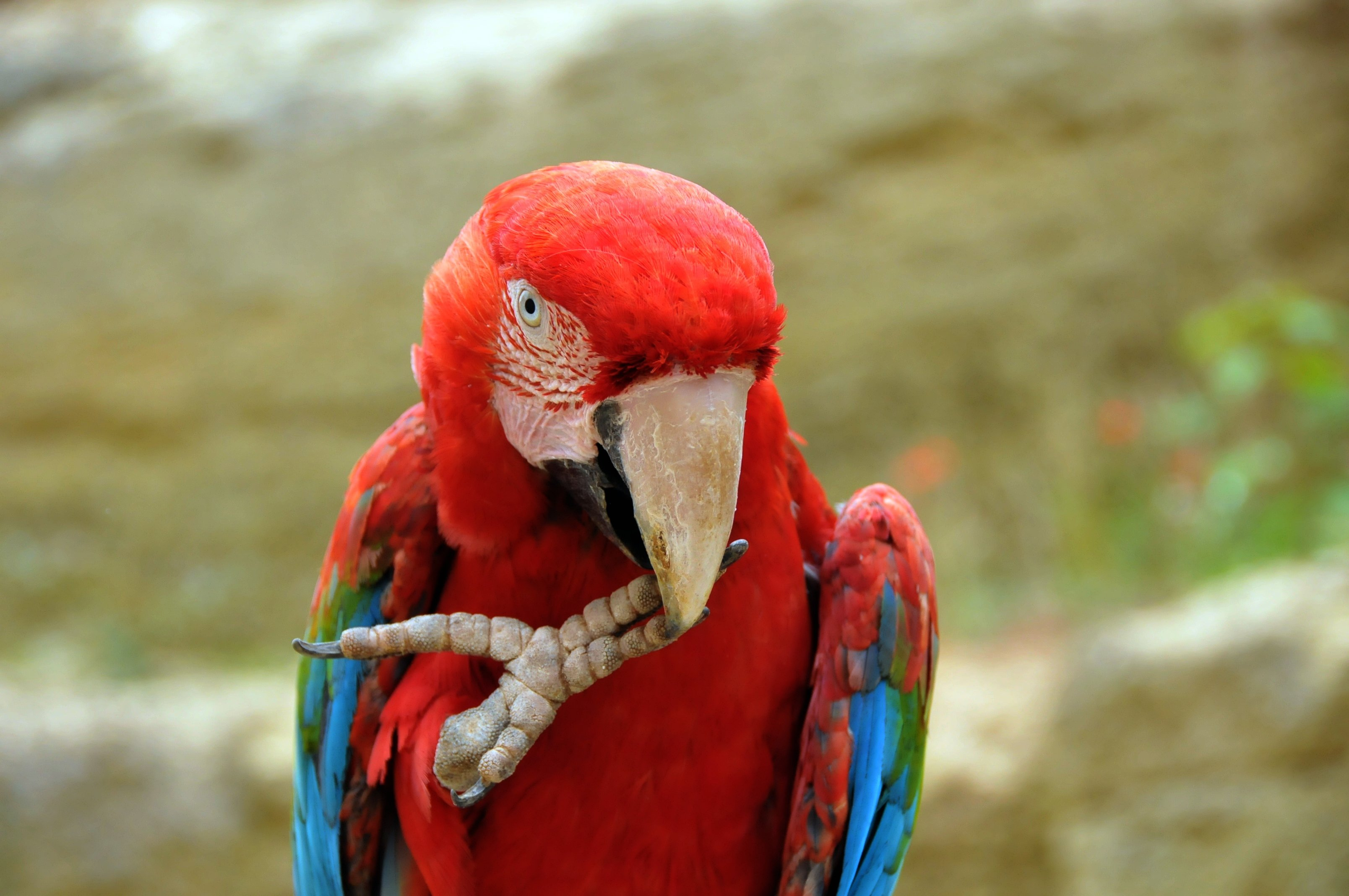
A green-winged macaw has raised its right foot to its beak.

Zygodactyly (from Greek ζυγος, even-numbered) is an arrangement of digits in birds and chameleons, with two toes facing forward (digits 2 and 3) and two back (digits 1 and 4). This arrangement is most common in arboreal species, particularly those that climb tree trunks or clamber through foliage. Zygodactyly occurs in the parrots, woodpeckers (including flickers), cuckoos (including roadrunners), and some owls. Zygodactyl tracks have been found dating to 120–110 million years ago (early Cretaceous), 50 million years before the first identified zygodactyl fossils. All Psittaciformes, Cuculiformes, the majority of Piciformes and the osprey are zygodactyl.

=== Heterodactyly ===
Heterodactyly is like zygodactyly, except that digits 3 and 4 point forward and digits 1 and 2 point back. This is found only in trogons, though the enantiornithean Dalingheornis might also have had this arrangement.

=== Pamprodactyly ===
Pamprodactyly is an arrangement in which all four toes point forward, outer toes (toe 1 and sometimes 4) often if not regularly reversible. It is a characteristic of swifts (Apodidae) and mousebirds (Coliiformes).

== Chameleons ==
The feet of chameleons are organized into bundles of a group of two and a group of three digits which oppose one another to grasp branches in a pincer-like arrangement. This condition has been called zygodactyly or didactyly, but the specific arrangement in chameleons does not fit either definition. The feet of the front limbs in chameleons, for instance, are organized into a medial bundle of digits 1, 2 and 3, and a lateral bundle of digits 4 and 5, while the feet of the hind limbs are organized into a medial bundle of digits 1 and 2, and a lateral bundle of digits 3, 4 and 5. On the other hand, zygodactyly involves digits 1 and 4 opposing digits 2 and 3, which is an arrangement that chameleons do not exhibit in either front or hind limbs.

== Aquatic tetrapods ==
In many secondarily aquatic vertebrates, the non-bony tissues of the forelimbs and/or hindlimbs are fused into a single flipper. Some remnant of each digit generally remains under the soft tissue of the flipper, though digit reduction gradually occurs such as in baleen whales (mysticeti). Marine mammals evolving flippers represents a classic example of convergent evolution, and by some analyses, parallel evolution.

Full webbing of the digits in the manus and/or pes is present in a number of aquatic tetrapods. Such animals include marine mammals (cetaceans, sirenians, and pinnipeds), marine reptiles (modern sea turtles and extinct ichthyosaurs, mosasaurs, plesiosaurs, metriorhynchids), and flightless aquatic birds such as penguins. Hyperphalangy, or an increase in the number of phalanges beyond ancestral mammal and reptile conditions, is present in modern cetaceans and extinct marine reptiles.

== Schizodactyly ==
Schizodactyly is a primate term for grasping and clinging with the second and third digit, instead of the thumb and second digit.

== See also ==
- Artiodactyl – even-toed ungulates, clade Cetartiodactyla
- Perissodactyl – odd-toed ungulates
