= Fryns =

Fryns may refer to:

- Fabien Fryns, Belgian art dealer and collector
- Fryns syndrome, a developmental genetic disorder
- Fryns-Aftimos syndrome, a rare chromosomal condition
- Lujan–Fryns syndrome, an X-linked genetic disorder
- Buttien-Fryns syndrome, a congenital genetic disorder
- Fryns (distillery), a Belgian jenever distillery
