= Perp =

Perp may refer to:

- A clipping of perpetrator
- A clipping of perpendicular
- Perpetual bond, a type of financial bond
- Perpetual futures, a type of futures contract
- PERP, a human protein-coding gene
- Perpendicular Gothic, a style of church architecture
