= Ectrodactyly-polydactyly syndrome =

- Other names: Ectrodactyly polydactyly
- Specialty: Medical genetics
- Symptoms: Combination of ectrodactyly and polydactyly
- Complications: Walking, grip
- Usual onset: Birth
- Duration: Life-long (ectrodactyly) but can be corrected with surgery (polydactyly)
- Prevention: None
- Frequency: very rare, only 4 cases have been reported in medical literature
- Deaths: -

Ectrodactyly-polydactyly syndrome is a very rare congenital limb malformation syndrome of genetic origin which is characterized a combination of ectrodactyly and polydactyly consisting of underdeveloped/absent central rays of the hands or feet alongside postaxial polydactyly in the same limb that can range from a hypoplastic, bone-devoid extra digit to a fully developed supernumerary digit. It has been described in four children from a single sibship in Belgium.
