= Dema language =

Bantu language of Mozambique

Dema
- vaDoma
- Native to: Mozambique
- Ethnicity: Vadoma
- Native speakers: (5,000 cited 2000)
- Language family: Niger–Congo?: Atlantic–Congo; Benue–Congo; Southern; Bantu; Shona (S.10); Dema

Language codes
- ISO 639-3: dmx
- Glottolog: dema1235

Dema is a Bantu language of Mozambique. It is closely related to Shona. The population has been displaced by the construction of a dam.

== Phrases ==
Greetings = aMukese/muMukese
