= Polydactyly in stem-tetrapods =

State of having more than five digits in ancient fish and tetrapods

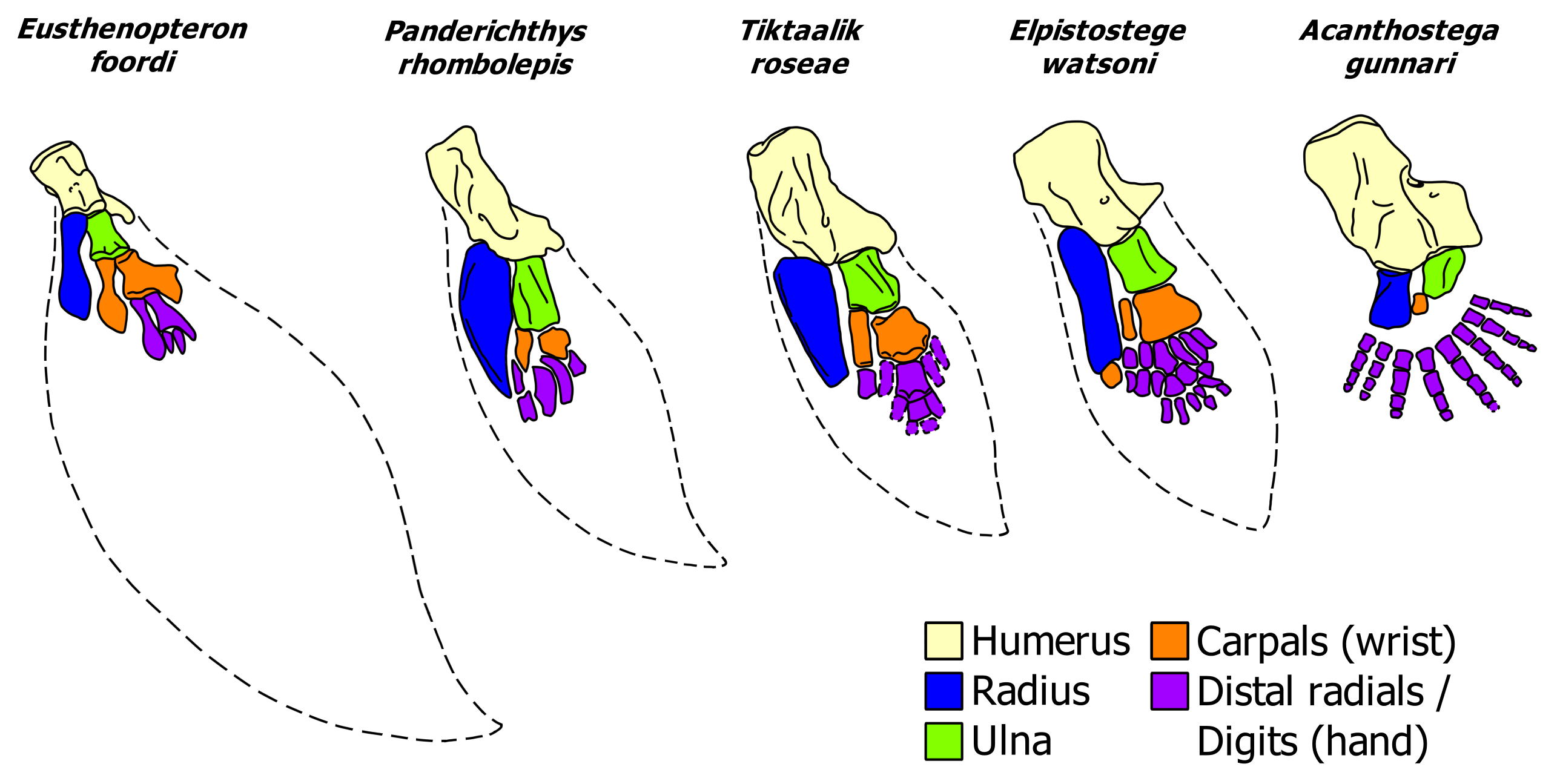
Limb evolution in Devonian tetrapodomorphs from pectoral fins to forelimbs. From left to right: Eusthenopteron, Panderichthys, Tiktaalik, Elpistostege, Acanthostega

Polydactyly in stem-tetrapods should here be understood as having more than five digits to the finger or foot, a condition that was the natural state of affairs in the earliest stegocephalians during the evolution of terrestriality. The polydactyly in these largely aquatic animals is not to be confused with polydactyly in the medical sense, i.e. it was not an anomaly in the sense it was not a congenital condition of having more than the typical number of digits for a given taxon. Rather, it appears to be a result of the early evolution from a limb with a fin rather than digits.

"Living tetrapods, such as the frogs, turtles, birds and mammals, are a subgroup of the tetrapod lineage. The lineage also includes finned and limbed tetrapods that are more closely related to living tetrapods than to living lungfishes." Tetrapods evolved from animals with fins such as found in lobe-finned fishes. From this condition a new pattern of limb formation evolved, where the development axis of the limb rotated to sprout secondary axes along the lower margin, giving rise to a variable number of very stout skeletal supports for a paddle-like foot. The condition is thought to have arisen from the loss of the fin ray-forming proteins actinodin 1 and actinodin 2 or modification of the expression of HOXD13. It is still unknown why exactly this happens. "SHH is produced by the mesenchymal cells of the zone of polarizing activity (ZPA) found at the posterior margin of the limbs of all vertebrates with paired appendages, including the most primitive chondrichthyian fishes. Its expression is driven by a well-conserved limb-specific enhancer called the ZRS (zone of polarizing region activity regulatory sequence) that is located approximately 1 Mb upstream of the coding sequence of Shh."

Devonian taxa were polydactylous. Acanthostega had eight digits on both the hindlimbs and forelimbs. Ichthyostega, which was both more derived and more specialized, had seven digits on the hindlimb, though the hand is unknown. The yet-more-derived Tulerpeton had six toes on both the hindlimbs and forelimbs.

It is unclear whether polydactylous tetrapods survived to the Carboniferous. Crassigyrinus, from the fossil-poor Romer's gap in the early Carboniferous, is usually thought to have had five digits to each foot. The anthracosaurs, which may be stem-tetrapods or reptiliomorphs, retained the five-toe pattern still found in amniotes. Further reduction had taken place in the temnospondyls, leaving the forefoot with four toes and the hind foot with five, a pattern still found in modern amphibians. The increasing knowledge of labyrinthodonts from Romer's gap has led to the challenging of the hypothesis that pentadactyly, as displayed by most modern tetrapods, is plesiomorphic. The number of digits was once thought to have been reduced in amphibians and reptiles independently, but more recent studies suggest that a single reduction occurred, along the tetrapod stem, in the Early Carboniferous. Even the early ichthyostegalians like Acanthostega and Ichthyostega appear to have had the forward ossified bony toes combined in a single stout digit, making them effectively five-toed.

== See also ==
- Polydactyl cat
- Polydactyly
