= Buttien-Fryns syndrome =

Congenital genetic disorder which causes oligodactyly and micrognathia

- Other names: Limb deficiencies distal with micrognathia
- Buttien-Fryns syndrome is inherited in an autosomal recessive inheritance
- Symptoms: Oligodactyly and micrognathia
- Frequency: Only 4 cases ever recorded

Buttien-Fryns syndrome is a congenital genetic disorder that causes severe oligodactyly and micrognathia. It is caused by a change in the structure of the 10q gene. The condition has been reported in four patients, two of which were siblings.

== Symptoms and signs ==
Oligodactyly and micrognathia are the most well known symptoms of the disease. Other symptoms include:

- Ankle and foot anomalies
- Nearsightedness
- Kidney hypoplasia/insufficiency
- Maxilla hypoplasia
- Microretrognathia
- Wrist and hand anomalies
- Ear anomalies
- Ulna anomalies
- Hearing loss
- Cryptorchidism
- High-arched palate
- Nystagmus
- Microglossia
- Microdontia
- Macrocephaly
- Cleft palate
- Other oral anomalies

== Cause ==
Buttien-Fryns syndrome is caused by a duplication or triplication of the 10q24 gene. This gene is also associated with other conditions such as split hand. The condition is inherited in an autosomal recessive manner.
