= Vadoma =

Tribe in the north of Zimbabwe

vaDoma
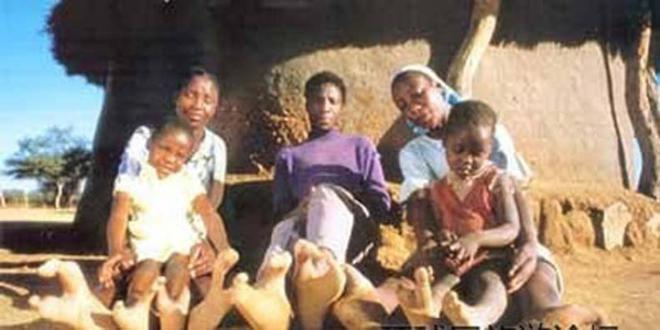
- Vadoma people with ectrodactyly

Regions with significant populations
- Zimbabwe
- Zimbabwe: 22,000

Languages
- Dema, Korekore Shona, Kunda

Religion
- Seventh-Day Adventist, African Traditional Religion

Related ethnic groups
- Khoisan, Shona

The Doma or vaDoma (singular muDoma), also known as Dema or Wadoma, are a band living in the Kanyemba region in the north of Zimbabwe, especially in the Hurungwe and Chipuriro districts around the basins of Mwazamutanda River, a tributary of the Zambezi River Valley. They are the only traditional hunter-gatherers indigenous to Zimbabwe and are famous for the inherited ectrodactyly existing among some vaDoma families at much higher rates than typical globally.

== Language ==
The vaDoma speak the Dema language, which is closely related to the dominant Shona language of Zimbabwe and largely comprehensible to those who speak the Korekore and Tande Shona dialects. Living alongside Shona and Kunda people in Kanyemba, they also speak Korekore Shona and Kunda.

== History ==
According to vaDoma mythology, their ancestors emerged from a baobab tree. Upon descending from it, they walked upright to hunt and gather the fruits of the land. The name vaDoma is also used in the Zambezi region for a semi-mythical people characterized as magical, capricious, hard to find, and living among the trees. This may refer to Khoisan hunter-gatherers who preceded the migration of the Bantu Shona into the Zambezi Valley, and the vaDoma are possibly related to this earlier population. Rumors also persist among nearby peoples that the vaDoma are capable of disappearing in the forest and performing magic.

Historically, the vaDoma chiefly dwelt in the mountains, living a largely nomadic lifestyle of hunting, fishing, trapping, honey hunting, and gathering wild fruits and roots. Prior to the European colonization of Africa, the vaDoma also resisted incorporation into the Korekore Shona kingdom of Mutapa, which resulted in little access to fertile land. Land reform after Zimbabwe's independence did not change this, despite pressure from the Mugabe government, and the vaDoma's continuing dispossession has made them Zimbabwe's only non-agricultural society, leading to stereotypes as "Stone Age cave-dwellers".

The mountain homeland of the vaDoma has now become the Chewore Safari Area. In recent years, vaDoma have been threatened by game rangers due to a crackdown on poaching. Many abandoned their hunter-gatherer lifestyle and moved to the lowlands. Today, though they have little contact with the majority populace, many vaDoma families live settled lives as semi-foragers, building houses on wooden platforms to avoid predators. During rainfall, they cover the shelters with thatching. vaDoma are also reluctant to wear textile fabrics. In 2014, the Seventh-day Adventist Church built Mariga Primary School to educate vaDoma children.

== Ectrodactyly ==
A substantial minority of vaDoma have a condition known as ectrodactyly in which the middle three toes are absent and the two outer ones are turned in, resulting in the band being known as the "two-toed" or "ostrich-footed" band. This is an autosomal dominant condition resulting from a single mutation on chromosome 3. It is reported that those with the condition are not handicapped and are well integrated into the community. While possibly an aid in tree climbing, the condition prevails because of a small genetic pool among the vaDoma and is propagated by the tribal law that forbids members to marry outside the group.

Due to the vaDoma band's isolation, they have developed and maintained ectrodactyly, and their comparatively small gene pool has resulted in the condition being much more frequent than elsewhere. The Talaunda/Talaote Kalanga of the Kalahari Desert also have a number of members with ectrodactyly and may share common ancestry with the vaDoma.
