= OTU deubiquitinase 5 =

Protein-coding gene in the species Homo sapiens

OTUD5

Identifiers
- Aliases: OTUD5, DUBA, OTU deubiquitinase 5, MCAND
- External IDs: OMIM: 300713; MGI: 1859615; GeneCards: OTUD5
Available structures
PDB	Ortholog search: PDBe RCSB
PDB	List of PDB id codes 3PFY, 3TMO, 3TMP
Enzyme activity
EC #	BRENDA	ExPASy	KEGG	MetaCyc
3.4.19.12	↗	↗	↗	↗

Gene location (Human)
Chr.	X chromosome (human)
Band	Xp11.23	Start	48,922,024 bp
Band	Xp11.23	End	48,958,386 bp

Gene location (Mouse)
Chr.	X chromosome (mouse)
Band	X A1.1|X 3.54 cM	Start	7,707,603 bp
Band	X A1.1|X 3.54 cM	End	7,742,865 bp
RNA expression pattern
Bgee	Human / Mouse (ortholog); Top expressed in: skin of arm; cardiac muscle tissue of right atrium; granulocyte; nasal epithelium; right hemisphere of cerebellum; prefrontal cortex; left ovary; right ovary; spleen; right frontal lobe / Top expressed in: granulocyte; Ileal epithelium; blood; neural layer of retina; zygote; thymus; dentate gyrus of hippocampal formation granule cell; tibiofemoral joint; superior frontal gyrus; ventricular zone; More reference expression data
BioGPS	n/a
Gene ontology
Molecular function	thiol-dependent deubiquitinase; peptidase activity; cysteine-type peptidase activity; hydrolase activity; Lys63-specific deubiquitinase activity; deubiquitinase activity; Lys48-specific deubiquitinase activity
Cellular component	cytosol
Biological process	negative regulation of type I interferon production; response to lipopolysaccharide; protein K63-linked deubiquitination; protein K48-linked deubiquitination; proteolysis; protein deubiquitination
Sources:Amigo / QuickGO
Orthologs
Databases	NCBI: entry; OMA: entry
Species	Human	Mouse
Entrez	55593	54644
Ensembl	ENSG00000068308	ENSMUSG00000031154
UniProt	Q96G74	Q3U2S4
RefSeq (mRNA)	NM_001136157; NM_001136158; NM_001136159; NM_017602	NM_001290536; NM_001290537; NM_138604
RefSeq (protein)	NP_001129629; NP_001129630; NP_001129631; NP_060072	NP_001277465; NP_001277466; NP_613070
Location (UCSC)	Chr X: 48.92 – 48.96 Mb	Chr X: 7.71 – 7.74 Mb
PubMed search
- Wikidata
View/Edit Human	View/Edit Mouse

OTU deubiquitinase 5 is a protein that in humans is encoded by the OTUD5 gene.

== Function ==
This gene encodes a member of the OTU (ovarian tumor) domain-containing cysteine protease superfamily. The OTU domain confers deubiquitinase activity and the encoded protein has been shown to suppress the type I interferon-dependent innate immune response by cleaving the polyubiquitin chain from an essential type I interferon adaptor protein. Cleavage results in disassociation of the adaptor protein from a downstream signaling complex and disruption of the type I interferon signaling cascade. Alternatively spliced transcript variants encoding different isoforms have been described.
