= Limb–mammary syndrome =

- Other names: LMS
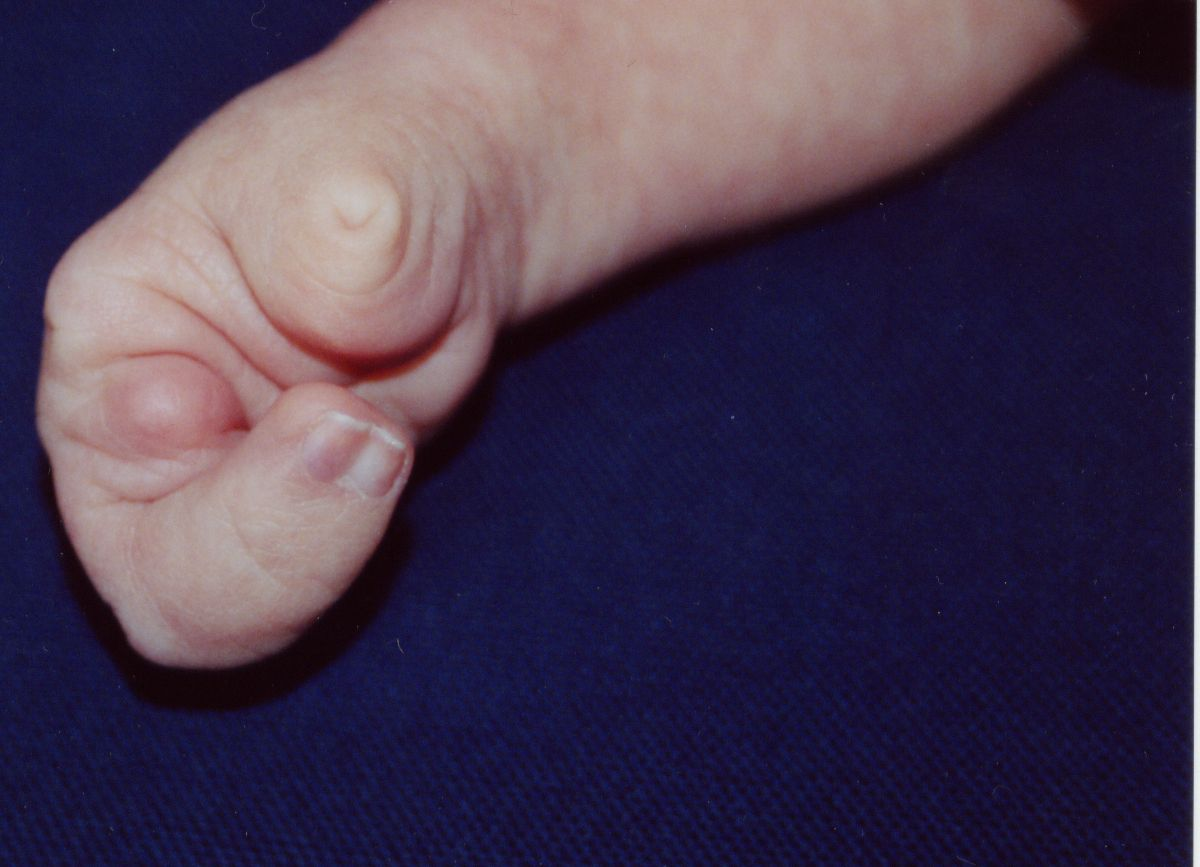
- hand of patient with Limb–mammary syndrome
- Specialty: Medical genetics

Limb–mammary syndrome is a cutaneous condition characterized by p63 mutations.

== See also ==
- List of cutaneous conditions
