= PERP =

Protein-coding gene in the species Homo sapiens

Identifiers
- Aliases: PERP, KCP1, KRTCAP1, PIGPC1, THW, dJ496H19.1, TP53 apoptosis effector, p53 apoptosis effector related to PMP22, EKVP7, OLMS2
- External IDs: OMIM: 609301; MGI: 1929938; HomoloGene: 11098; GeneCards: PERP; OMA:PERP - orthologs

Gene location (Human)
Chr.	Chromosome 6 (human)
Band	6q23.3	Start	138,088,505 bp
Band	6q23.3	End	138,107,419 bp

Gene location (Mouse)
Chr.	Chromosome 10 (mouse)
Band	10|10 A3	Start	18,720,768 bp
Band	10|10 A3	End	18,732,821 bp
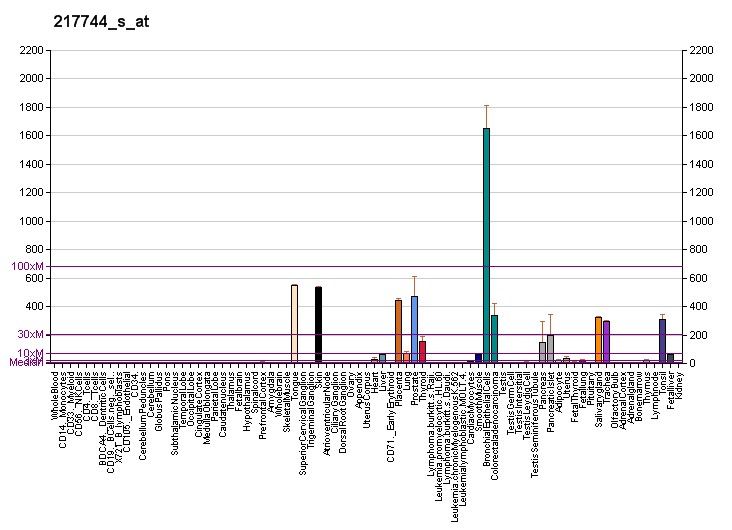
RNA expression pattern
Bgee	Human / Mouse (ortholog); Top expressed in: human penis; skin of thigh; mucosa of pharynx; nipple; skin of hip; vulva; oral cavity; gingival epithelium; body of tongue; epithelium of nasopharynx / Top expressed in: corneal stroma; epidermis; hair follicle; skin of external ear; lip; skin of back; transitional epithelium of urinary bladder; skin of abdomen; molar; esophagus; More reference expression data
BioGPS	More reference expression data
Orthologs
Species	Human	Mouse
Entrez	64065	64058
Ensembl	ENSG00000112378	ENSMUSG00000019851
UniProt	Q96FX8	Q9JK95
RefSeq (mRNA)	NM_022121	NM_022032
RefSeq (protein)	NP_071404	NP_071315
Location (UCSC)	Chr 6: 138.09 – 138.11 Mb	Chr 10: 18.72 – 18.73 Mb
PubMed search
- Wikidata
View/Edit Human	View/Edit Mouse

p53 apoptosis effector related to PMP-22 is a plasma membrane protein that, in humans, is encoded by the PERP gene.

PERP is a direct transcriptional target of p53, but its transcription can also be regulated by other transcription factors.

PERP is important for skin development, and loss of PERP is associated with the development and progression of several types of human cancers.
