= Ectrodactyly =

Malformation of the central digit(s) of the hand or foot

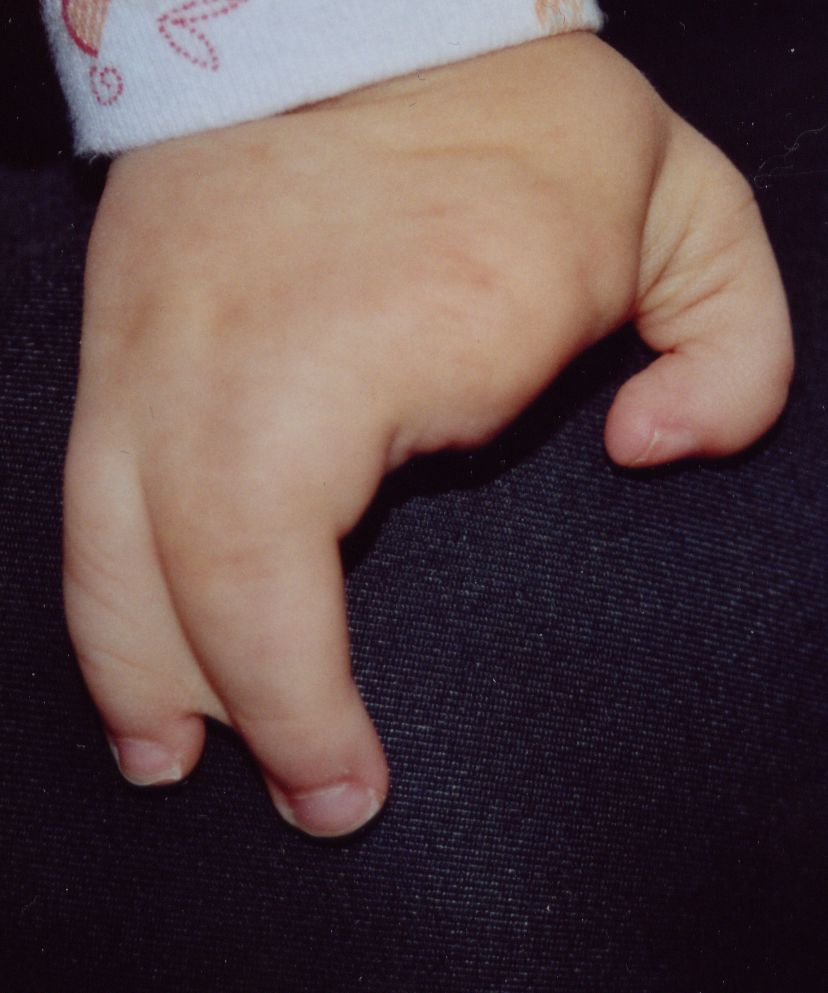
- Ectrodactyly and syndactyly on the hand of a one-year-old child
- Specialty: Medical genetics

Ectrodactyly, split hand, or cleft hand (from Ancient Greek ἔκτρωμα (éktroma) 'miscarriage' and δάκτυλος (dáktulos) 'finger') involves the deficiency or absence of one or more central digits of the hand or foot and is also known as split hand/split foot malformation (SHFM). The hands and feet of people with ectrodactyly (ectrodactyls) are often described as "claw-like" and may include only the thumb and one finger (usually either the little finger, ring finger, or a syndactyly of the two) with similar abnormalities of the feet.

It is a substantial rare form of a congenital disorder in which the development of the hand is disturbed. It is a type I failure of formation – longitudinal arrest. The central ray of the hand is affected and usually appears without proximal deficiencies of nerves, vessels, tendons, muscles and bones in contrast to the radial and ulnar deficiencies. The cleft hand appears as a V-shaped cleft situated in the centre of the hand. The digits at the borders of the cleft might be syndactilyzed, and one or more digits can be absent. In most types, the thumb, ring finger and little finger are the less affected parts of the hand. The incidence of cleft hand varies from 1 in 90,000 to 1 in 10,000 births depending on the used classification. Cleft hand can appear unilateral or bilateral, and can appear isolated or associated with a syndrome.

Split hand/foot malformation (SHFM) is characterized by underdeveloped or absent central digital rays, clefts of hands and feet, and variable syndactyly of the remaining digits. SHFM is a heterogeneous condition caused by abnormalities at one of multiple loci, including SHFM1 (SHFM1 at 7q21-q22), SHFM2 (Xq26), SHFM3 (FBXW4/DACTYLIN at 10q24), SHFM4 (TP63 at 3q27), and SHFM5 (DLX1 and DLX 2 at 2q31). SHFM3 is unique in that it is caused by submicroscopic tandem chromosome duplications of FBXW4/DACTYLIN. SHFM3 is considered 'isolated' ectrodactyly and does not show a mutation of the tp63 gene.

== Presentation ==
Ectrodactyly can be caused by various changes to 7q. When 7q is altered by a deletion or a translocation, ectrodactyly can sometimes be associated with hearing loss. Ectrodactyly, or Split hand/split foot malformation (SHFM) type 1 is the only form of split hand/ malformation associated with sensorineural hearing loss.

== Genetics ==
Syndrome
Ectrodactyly–ectodermal dysplasia–cleft syndrome
Split-Hand-Foot Malformation Syndrome
Silver–Russell syndrome
Cornelia de Lange syndrome
Acrorenal syndrome
Focal dermal hypoplasia
Ectrodactyly and cleft palate syndrome
Ectrodactyly/mandibulofacial dysostosis
Ectrodactyly and macular dystrophy
Buttien-Fryns syndrome

A large number of human gene defects can cause ectrodactyly. The most common mode of inheritance is autosomal dominant with reduced penetrance, while autosomal recessive and X-linked forms occur more rarely. Ectrodactyly can also be caused by a duplication on 10q24. Detailed studies of a number of mouse models for ectrodactyly have also revealed that a failure to maintain median apical ectodermal ridge (AER) signalling can be the main pathogenic mechanism in triggering this abnormality.

A number of factors make the identification of the genetic defects underlying human ectrodactyly a complicated process: the limited number of families linked to each split hand/foot malformation (SHFM) locus, the large number of morphogens involved in limb development, the complex interactions between these morphogens, the involvement of modifier genes, and the presumed involvement of multiple gene or long-range regulatory elements in some cases of ectrodactyly. In the clinical setting these genetic characteristics can become problematic and making predictions of carrier status and severity of the disease impossible to predict.

In 2011, a novel mutation in DLX5 was found to be involved in SHFM.

Ectrodactyly is frequently seen with other congenital anomalies. Syndromes in which ectrodactyly is associated with other abnormalities can occur when two or more genes are affected by a chromosomal rearrangement. Disorders associated with ectrodactyly include Ectrodactyly-Ectodermal Dysplasia-Clefting (EEC) syndrome, which is closely correlated to the ADULT syndrome and Limb-mammary (LMS) syndrome, Ectrodactyly-Cleft Palate (ECP) syndrome, Ectrodactyly-Ectodermal Dysplasia-Macular Dystrophy syndrome, Ectrodactyly-Fibular Aplasia/Hypoplasia (EFA) syndrome, and Ectrodactyly-Polydactyly. More than 50 syndromes and associations involving ectrodactyly are distinguished in the London Dysmorphology Database.

== Pathophysiology ==
The pathophysiology of cleft hand is thought to be a result of a wedge-shaped defect of the apical ectoderm of the limb bud (AER: apical ectodermal ridge). Polydactyly, syndactyly and cleft hand can occur within the same hand, therefore some investigators suggest that these entities occur from the same mechanism. This mechanism is not yet defined.

=== Genetics ===
The cause of cleft hand lies, for what is known, partly in genetics. The inheritance of cleft hand is autosomal dominant and has a variable penetrance of 70%. Cleft hand can be a spontaneous mutation during pregnancy (de novo mutation). The exact chromosomal defect in isolated cleft hand is not yet defined. However, the genetic causes of cleft hand related to syndromes have more clarity. The identified mutation for SHSF syndrome (split-hand/split-foot syndrome) a duplication on 10q24, and not a mutation of the tp63 gene as in families affected by EEC syndrome (ectrodactyly–ectodermal dysplasia–cleft syndrome). The p63 gene plays a critical role in the development of the apical ectodermal ridge (AER), this was found in mutant mice with dactylaplasia.

=== Embryology ===
Some studies have postulated that polydactyly, syndactyly and cleft hand have the same teratogenic mechanism. In vivo tests showed that limb anomalies were found alone or in combination with cleft hand when they were given Myleran. These anomalies take place in humans around day 41 of gestation.

== Diagnosis ==
=== Classification ===
There are several classifications for cleft hand, but the most used classification is described by Manske and Halikis see table 3. This classification is based on the first web space. The first web space is the space between the thumb and the index finger.

Table 3: Classification for cleft hand described by Manske and Halikis

Type	Description	Characteristics
I	Normal web	Thumb web space not narrowed
IIA	Mildly narrowed web	Thumb web space mildly narrowed
IIB	Severely narrowed web	Thumb web space severely narrowed
III	Syndactylized web	Thumb and index rays syndactylized, web space obliterated
IV	Merged web	Index ray suppressed, thumb web space is merged with the cleft
V	Absent web	Thumb elements suppressed, ulnar rays remain, thumb web space no longer present

== Treatment ==
The treatment of cleft hand is usually invasive and can differ each time because of the heterogeneity of the condition. The function of a cleft hand is mostly not restricted, yet improving the function is one of the goals when the thumb or first webspace is absent.

The social and stigmatizing aspects of a cleft hand require more attention. The hand is a part of the body which is usually shown during communication. When this hand is obviously different and deformed, stigmatization or rejection can occur. Sometimes, in families with cleft hand with good function, operations for cosmetic aspects are considered marginal and the families choose not to have surgery.

=== Indications ===
Surgical treatment of the cleft hand is based on several indications:

- Improving function
- Absent thumb
- Deforming syndactyly (mostly between digits of unequal length like index and thumb)
- Transverse bones (this will progress the deformity; growth of these bones will widen the cleft)
- Narrowed first webspace
- The feet

Aesthetical aspects

- Reducing deformity

=== Timing of surgical interventions ===
The timing of surgical interventions is debatable. Parents have to decide about their child in a very vulnerable time of their parenthood. Indications for early treatment are progressive deformities, such as syndactyly between index and thumb or transverse bones between the digital rays. Other surgical interventions are less urgent and can wait for 1 or 2 years.

=== Classification and treatment ===
When surgery is indicated, the choice of treatment is based on the classification. Table 4 shows the treatment of cleft hand divided into the classification of Manske and Halikis. Techniques described by Ueba, Miura and Komada and the procedure of Snow-Littler are guidelines; since clinical and anatomical presentation within the types differ, the actual treatment is based on the individual abnormality.

Table 4: Treatment based on the classification of Manske and Halikis

Type	Treatment
I/IIA	Reconstruction of the transverse metacarpal ligament
IIB/III	Transposition of the index metacarpal with reconstruction of the thumb webspace
IV	Mobility and/or position of the thumb of ulnar digit to promote pinch and grasp
V	There is no cleft or web space and the thumb is very deficient. This hand requires consideration of creating a radial digit

=== Snow-Littler ===
The goal of this procedure is to create a wide first web space and to minimize the cleft in the hand. The index digit will be transferred to the ulnar side of the cleft. Simultaneously a correction of index malrotation and deviation is performed. To minimize the cleft, it is necessary to fix together the metacarpals which used to border the cleft. Through repositioning flaps, the wound can be closed.

=== Ueba ===
Ueba described a less complicated surgery. Transverse flaps are used to resurface the palm, the dorsal side of the transposed digit and the ulnar part of the first web space. A tendon graft is used to connect the common extensor tendons of the border digits of the cleft to prevent digital separation during extension. The closure is simpler, but has cosmetic disadvantage because of the switch between palmar and dorsal skin.

=== Miura and Komada ===
The release of the first webspace has the same principle as the Snow-Littler procedure. The difference is the closure of the first webspace; this is done by simple closure or closure with Z-plasties.

== History ==
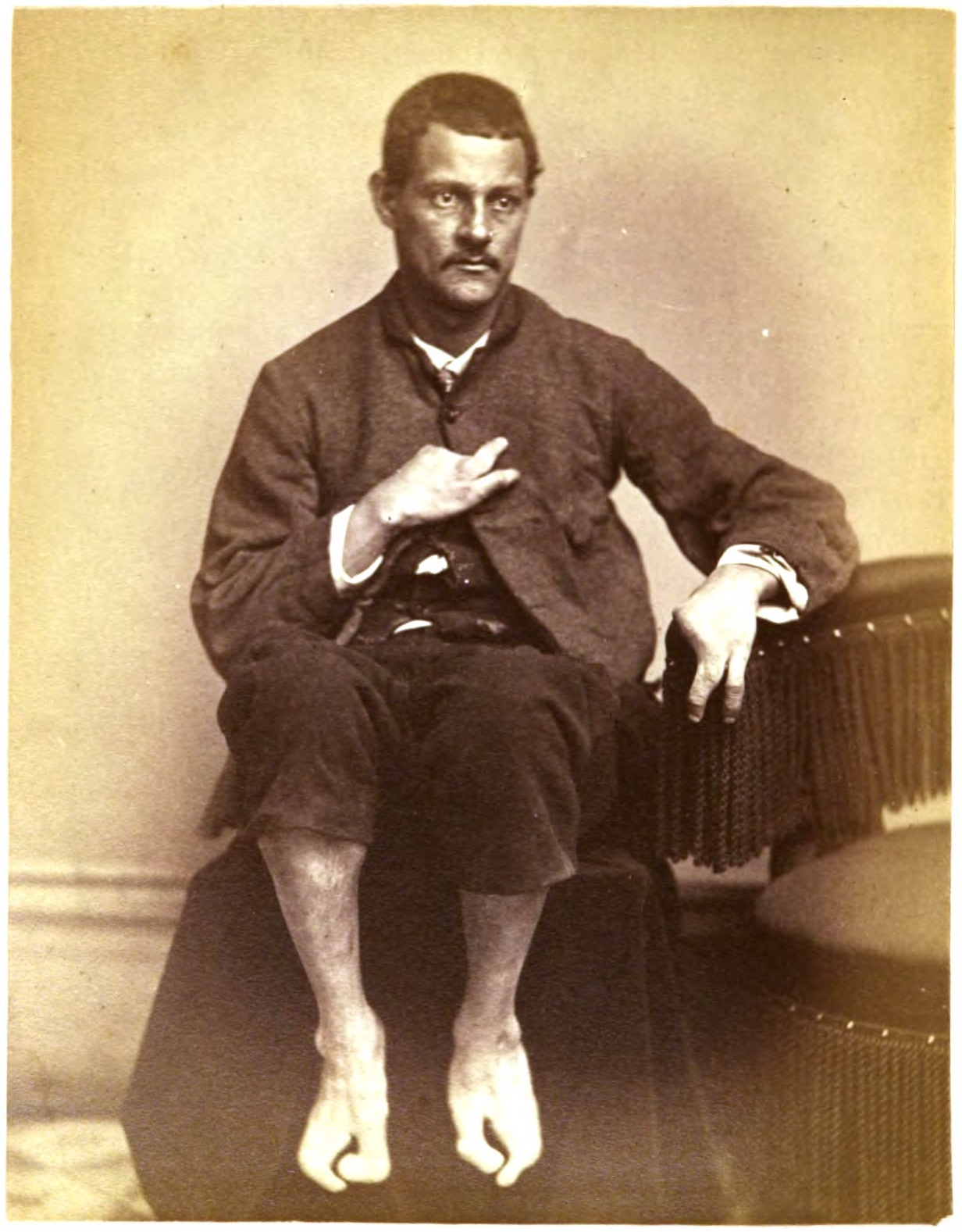
Ectrodactyly in all extremities; only eight total digits present, 1870

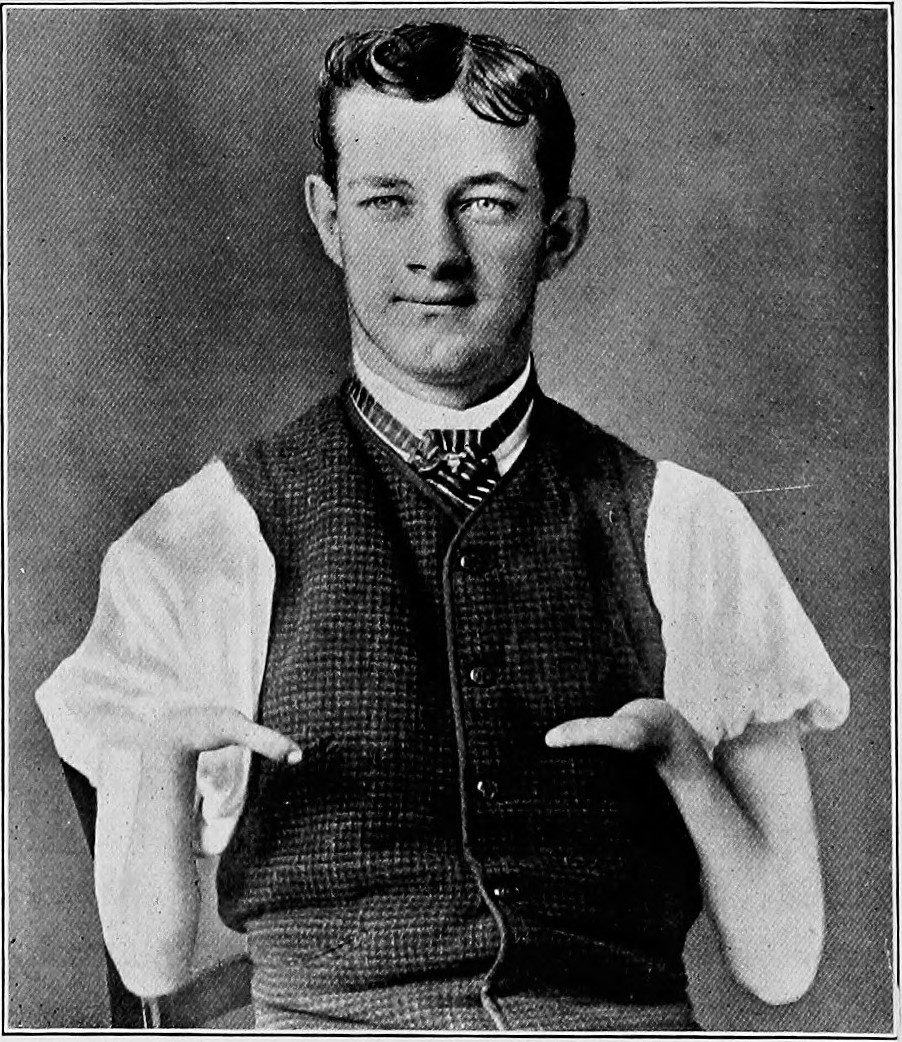
Monodactyly of both hands; only two fingers present, 1897

Literature shows that cleft hand is described centuries ago. In City of God (426 A.D.), St. Augustine remarks:

At Hippo-Diarrhytus there is a man whose hands are crescent-shaped, and have only two fingers each, and his feet similarly formed.

The first modern reference to what might be considered a cleft hand was by Ambroise Paré in 1575. Hartsink (1770) wrote the first report of true cleft hand. In 1896, the first operation of the cleft hand was performed by Doctor Charles N. Dowed of New York City. However, the first certain description of what we know as a cleft hand as we know it today was described at the end of the 19th century.

=== Symbrachydactyly ===
Typical cleft hand	Atypical cleft hand (symbrachydactyly)
Typical hand was manifest in the complete or incomplete absence of the middle finger	Atypical hand had a more severe manifestation in which there was varying absence of the central index, middle and ring finger rays
V-shaped cleft	U-shaped cleft
One to four limbs involved	One limb involved (no feet)
Higher incidence	Lower incidence
Autosomal dominant	Sporadic
Suppression progresses in a radial direction so that in the monodactylous form the most ulnar finger is preserved	Suppression progresses in a more ulnar direction; therefore in the monodactylous form the thumb is usually the last remaining digit

Historically, a U-type cleft hand was also known as atypical cleft hand. The classification in which typical and atypical cleft hand are described was mostly used for clinical aspects and is shown in table 1. Nowadays, this "atypical cleft hand" is referred to as symbrachydactyly and is not a subtype of cleft hand.

== Notable cases ==
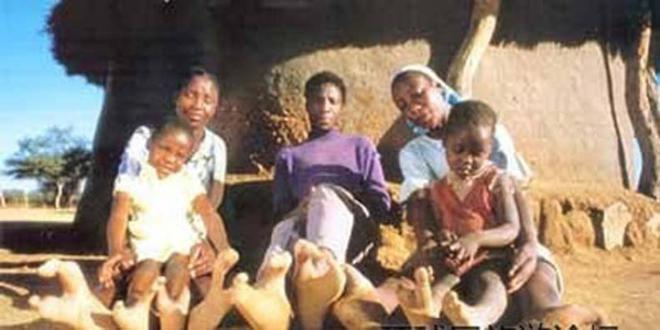
Vadoma people with ectrodactyly

- Bree Walker Once a popular television anchor woman in Los Angeles, she has appeared in the television drama Nip/Tuck as an inspirational character who battles her condition and counsels another family who have children with ectrodactyly
- Grady Stiles Sr. and Grady Stiles Jr.: known publicly as Lobster Boy and family, famous side show acts, featured on the AMC reality show, Freakshow.
- The Vadoma tribe in northern Zimbabwe
- Mikhail Tal, Soviet chess player, World Chess Champion 1960–61
  - Photograph showing his right profile and right hand with ectrodactyly
- Lee Hee-ah, a Korean pianist with only two fingers on each hand.
- Black Scorpion, freak show performer.
- Sam Schröder, 2020 US Open Quad Champion.
- Francesca Jones, British pro tennis player, former #149 in WTA rankings.

== Animals ==
Ectrodactyly is not only a genetic characteristic in humans, but can also occur in frogs and toads, mice, salamanders, cows, chickens, rabbits, marmosets, cats and dogs, and even West Indian manatees.

=== Wood frog ===
The Department of Biological Sciences at the University of Alberta in Edmonton, Alberta performed a study to estimate deformity levels in wood frogs in areas of relatively low disturbance. After roughly 22,733 individuals were examined during field studies, it was found that only 49 wood frogs had the ectrodactyly deformity.

=== Salamanders ===
In a study performed by the Department of Forestry and Natural Resources at Purdue University, approximately 2000 salamanders (687 adults and 1259 larvae) were captured from a large wetland complex and evaluated for malformations. Among the 687 adults, 54 (7.9%) were malformed. Of these 54 adults, 46 (85%) had missing (ectrodactyly), extra (polyphalangy) or dwarfed digits (brachydactyly). Among the 1259 larvae, 102 were malformed, with 94 (92%) of the malformations involving ectrodactyly, polyphalangy, and brachydactyly. Results showed few differences in the frequency of malformations among life-history changes, suggesting that malformed larvae do not have substantially higher mortality than their adult conspecifics.

=== Cats and dogs ===
Davis and Barry 1977 tested allele frequencies in domestic cats. Among the 265 cats observed, there were 101 males and 164 females. Only one cat was recorded to have the ectrodactyly abnormality, illustrating this rare disease.

According to M. P. Ferreira, a case of ectrodactyly was found in a two-month-old male mixed Terrier dog. In another study, Carrig and co-workers also reported a series of 14 dogs with this abnormality proving that although ectrodactyly is an uncommon occurrence for dogs, it is not entirely unheard of.

== See also ==
- Oligodactyly
- Sonic hedgehog, a main gene responsible for body symmetry during development.
