= BCS1L =

Protein-coding gene in humans

Identifiers
- Aliases: BCS1L, BCS, BCS1, BJS, FLNMS, GRACILE, Hs.6719, MC3DN1, PTD, h-BCS, h-BCS1, BCS1 homolog, ubiquinol-cytochrome c reductase complex chaperone
- External IDs: OMIM: 603647; MGI: 1914071; GeneCards: BCS1L

Gene location (Human)
Chr.	Chromosome 2 (human)
Band	2q35	Start	218,658,764 bp
Band	2q35	End	218,663,443 bp

Gene location (Mouse)
Chr.	Chromosome 1 (mouse)
Band	1|1 C4	Start	74,627,448 bp
Band	1|1 C4	End	74,631,602 bp
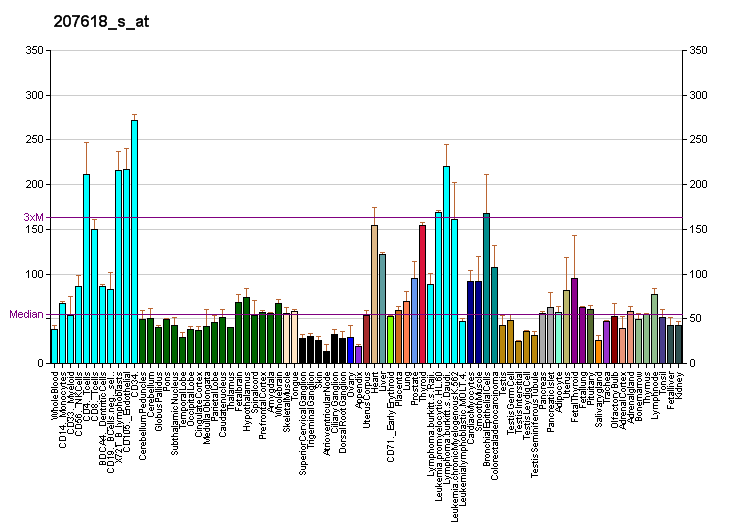
RNA expression pattern
Bgee	Human / Mouse (ortholog); Top expressed in: body of pancreas; apex of heart; right uterine tube; right lobe of liver; mucosa of transverse colon; right adrenal gland; right adrenal cortex; right lobe of thyroid gland; body of stomach; right ovary / Top expressed in: interventricular septum; soleus muscle; digastric muscle; sternocleidomastoid muscle; medial ganglionic eminence; myocardium of ventricle; right kidney; extraocular muscle; proximal tubule; granulocyte; More reference expression data
BioGPS	More reference expression data
Gene ontology
Molecular function	nucleotide binding; protein binding; ATP binding
Cellular component	mitochondrial respiratory chain complex III; mitochondrial inner membrane; integral component of membrane; membrane; mitochondrion
Biological process	mitochondrion organization; mitochondrial respiratory chain complex III assembly; mitochondrial cytochrome c oxidase assembly; mitochondrial respiratory chain complex I assembly
Sources:Amigo / QuickGO
Orthologs
Databases	NCBI: entry; OMA: entry
Species	Human	Mouse
Entrez	617	66821
Ensembl	ENSG00000074582	ENSMUSG00000026172
UniProt	Q9Y276	Q9CZP5
RefSeq (mRNA)	NM_001079866; NM_001257342; NM_001257343; NM_001257344; NM_004328 NM_001318836; NM_001320717	NM_025784; NM_001305652
RefSeq (protein)	NP_001073335; NP_001244271; NP_001244272; NP_001244273; NP_001305765 NP_001307646; NP_004319; NP_001358372; NP_001358373; NP_001358375; NP_001358376; NP_001358377; NP_001358378; NP_001358379; NP_001358380; NP_001358381; NP_001358382; NP_001358383; NP_001358384; NP_001358385; NP_001361014; NP_001361015	NP_001292581; NP_080060
Location (UCSC)	Chr 2: 218.66 – 218.66 Mb	Chr 1: 74.63 – 74.63 Mb
PubMed search
- Wikidata
View/Edit Human	View/Edit Mouse

BCS1 N-terminal domain

Identifiers
- Symbol: BCS1_N
- Pfam: PF08740
- InterPro: IPR014851
Available protein structures:
- PDB: IPR014851 PF08740 (ECOD; PDBsum)
- AlphaFold: IPR014851; PF08740

Mitochondrial chaperone BCS1 (BCS1L), also known as BCS1 homolog, ubiquinol-cytochrome c reductase complex chaperone (h-BCS1), is a protein that in humans is encoded by the BCS1L gene. BCS1L is a chaperone protein involved in the assembly of Ubiquinol Cytochrome c Reductase (complex III), which is located in the inner mitochondrial membrane and is part of the electron transport chain. Mutations in this gene are associated with mitochondrial complex III deficiency (nuclear, 1), GRACILE syndrome, and Bjoernstad syndrome.

== Structure ==
BCS1L is located on the q arm of chromosome 2 in position 35 and has 10 exons. The BCS1L gene produces a 47.5 kDa protein composed of 419 amino acids. The protein encoded by BCS1L belongs to the AAA ATPase family, BCS1 subfamily. BCS1L is a phosphoprotein and chaperone for Ubiquinol Cytochrome c Reductase assembly. It contains a nucleotide binding site for ATP-binding. BCS1L does not contain a mitochondrial targeting sequence but experimental studies confirm that it is imported into mitochondria. A conserved domain at the N-terminus of BCS1L is responsible for the import and intramitochondrial sorting. Associating to the inner mitochondrial membrane, BCS1L has a transmembrane domain in between two topological domains, passing through the inner mitochondrial membrane once. The majority of the protein is in the mitochondrial matrix. Several alternatively spliced transcripts encoding two different isoforms have been described.

== Function ==
BCS1L encodes a protein that is located in the inner mitochondrial membrane and involved in the assembly of Ubiquinol Cytochrome c Reductase (complex III). Complex III plays an important role in the mitochondrial respiratory chain by transferring electrons from the Rieske iron-sulfur protein to cytochrome c. BCS1L is essential for this process through its role in the maintenance of mitochondrial tubular networks, respiratory chain assembly, and formation of the LETM1 complex.

== Clinical Significance ==
Variants of BCS1L have been associated with mitochondrial complex III deficiency, nuclear 1, GRACILE syndrome, and Bjoernstad syndrome. Mitochondrial complex III deficiency, nuclear 1 is a disorder of the mitochondrial respiratory chain resulting in reduced complex III activity and highly variable clinical features usually resulting in multi-system organ failure. Clinical features may include mitochondrial encephalopathy, psychomotor retardation, ataxia, severe failure to thrive, liver dysfunction, renal tubulopathy, muscle weakness, exercise intolerance, lactic acidosis, hypotonia, seizures, and optic atrophy. Pathogenic mutations have included R45C, R56X, T50A, R73C, P99L, R155P, V353M, G129R, R183C, F368I, and S277N. These mutations tend to affect the ATP-binding residues of BCS1L.

Growth retardation, aminoaciduria, cholestasis, iron overload, lactic acidosis, and early death (GRACILE) is a recessively inherited lethal disease that results in multi-system organ failure. GRACILE is characterized by fetal growth retardation, lactic acidosis, aminoaciduria, cholestasis, and abnormalities in iron metabolism. Pathogenic mutations have included S78G, R144Q, and V327A.

Bjoernstad syndrome is an autosomal recessive disease primarily affecting hearing. This disease is characterized by congenital hearing loss and twisted hairs, a condition known as pili torti, in which hair shafts are flattened at irregular intervals and twisted 180 degrees from the normal axis, making the hair extremely brittle. Pathogenic mutations have included Y301N, R184C, G35R, R114W, R183H, Q302E, and R306H. These mutations tend to affect the protein-protein interactions of BCS1L.

== Interactions ==
BCS1L has 11 protein-protein interactions with 8 of them being co-complex interactions. BCS1L has been found to interact with LETM1, DNAJA1, and DDX24.

== See also ==
- Björnstad syndrome
