= Rosselli–Gulienetti syndrome =

- Other names: Zlotogora–Ogur syndrome
- This condition is inherited in an autosomal recessive manner

Rosselli–Gulienetti syndrome, also known as Zlotogora–Ogur syndrome and Bowen–Armstrong syndrome, is a type of congenital ectodermal dysplasia syndrome. The syndrome is relatively rare and has only been described in a few cases.

== Signs and symptoms ==
There is a range of signs and symptoms including cleft lip or palate, intellectual disabilities and various forms of ectodermal dysplasia. Additional symptoms may include fused eyelids, absent nails, delayed bone growth and dry skin. It is believed that this syndrome follows an autosomal dominant pattern of inheritance with incomplete penetrance, and caused by a mutation affecting the TP63 gene. It has been suggested that this syndrome, AEC syndrome and Rapp–Hodgkin syndrome may be variations of the same disease.

It is not uncommon for heterozygotes for the condition (especially those originating from Margarita Island) to have a broad and flat philtrum.

== Cause ==
It is caused by mutations in the gene PVRL1 (11q23-q24) which encodes nectin-1, the principal receptor used by alpha-herpesviruses to mediate entry into human cells. Although the mechanism underlying the physiopathology of this syndrome is still unknown, it has been proposed that nectin-1 is a cell-cell adhesion molecule that is preferentially expressed in keratinocytes and that mutations in PVRL1 may abrogate NAP (nectin, afadin, ponsin)-dependent cell-cell adhesion. It is thought that the genetic transmission is autosomal recessive gene transmission.[8]

The cause was found in the year 2000 by Suzuki et al. when he analyzed the genome of patients with the disorder and discovered a homozygous nonsense mutation in the PVRL1 gene, in chromosome 11. It was suggested that the regular occurrence of this disorder among the people of Margarita Island was due to resistance to alpha-herpes viruses people carrying only one copy of the mutated gene (heterozygosity) had. The same mutation in the same gene was found in two families from the Middle East and South America (Israel and Brazil respectively.) by the same researchers (Suzuki et al.)

== Diagnosis ==
Diagnosis is usually done by genetic testing.

== Treatment ==
There is no specific treatment or cure for individuals affected with this type of syndrome, though some of the abnormal physical features may be surgically correctable.

== Epidemiology ==
About 35 cases have been described in medical literature.

In Margarita Island, Venezuela, it is estimated that 1 out of every 22 people carry one copy of the Rosselli-Gulienitti-causing mutation, while 5 out of every 1,000 live births in the same island are born with the disease itself.
