= Pili torti =

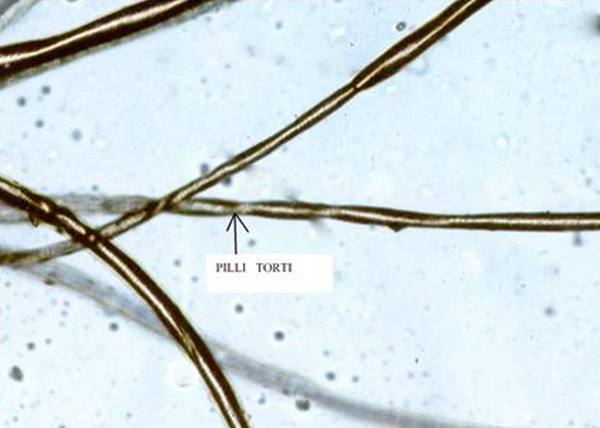
- Menkes disease
- Specialty: Medical genetics

Pili torti (singular pilus tortus; also known as "twisted hairs") is characterized by short and brittle hairs that appear flattened and twisted when viewed through a microscope.

Pili torti can be acquired or inherited. Many different genetic syndromes such as Björnstad syndrome and Menkes disease can cause pili torti. Different ectodermal dysplasias like Rapp-Hodgkin syndrome and ankyloblepharon-ectodermal defects-cleft lip/palate syndrome can also cause pili torti. Acquired pili torti can be associated with different dermatological conditions or medications. Pili torti is often associated with cicatricial alopecia including lichen planopilaris, frontal fibrosing alopecia, and discoid lupus erythematosus. Epidermal growth factor receptor inhibitors, oral retinoids, sodium valproate, and carbamide perhydrate have been known to induce pili torti.

The diagnosis of pili torti is made via trichoscopic and microscopic inspection. Pili torti does not have any specific treatment.

== Signs and symptoms ==
Clinically, the hair of individuals with pili torti is dry, coarse, brittle, and fragile. It could lead to patchy alopecia. The most common area affected is the scalp, particularly the occipital and temporal regions. But the eyelashes, pubic hair, axilla, and eyebrows could also be affected. Typically, pili torti just impact a portion of the hair and do not alter the entire length of the hair. Occasionally, isolated pili torti might be discovered in a typical scalp. But it could be connected to a lot of regional and systemic issues.

== Causes ==
Pili torti can be acquired or inherited. There are three types of inherited pili torti: classic early onset (Ronchese type), late onset (Beare type), and pili torti linked to hereditary illnesses or disorders.

Starting in early life, the classic (Ronchese) type is an autosomal dominant or recessive disease. The third month to the third year of life is when the sickness first manifests. Blond girls are more frequently impacted. Hair twist clusters are typically seen in early-onset pili torti. With age, the disease frequently gets better, especially after puberty.

Usually manifesting after puberty, late onset type is an autosomal dominant condition. People with dark hair seem to experience it more frequently. The hair twists in the late onset form are typically solitary, in contrast to the early onset kind.

Pili torti can also be associated with other genetic conditions such as abnormal hair, joint laxity, and developmental delay, acrofacial dysostosis, Palagonia type, argininosuccinic aciduria, autosomal recessive ichthyosis with hypotrichosis, Bazex-Dupre-Christol syndrome, Björnstad syndrome, citrullinemia, congenital disorder of glycosylation, type Ia, congenital erythropoietic porphyria, congenital hypotrichosis with juvenile macular dystrophy, Conradi-Hünermann syndrome, Crandall syndrome, giant axonal neuropathy, hypotrichosis 6, Laron syndrome, Marie Unna hypotrichosis, McCune–Albright syndrome, Menkes disease, mitochondrial diseases, Netherton syndrome, occipital horn syndrome, Olmsted syndrome, peeling skin syndrome, Salti-Salem syndrome, steatocystoma multiplex, tricho-hepato-enteric syndrome, and trichothiodystrophy, photosensitive.

A diverse range of hereditary diseases known as ectodermal dysplasias are defined by birth abnormalities in one or more ectodermal structures and associated appendages, such as the hair, teeth, nails, and sweat glands. There have been reports of pili torti in several ectodermal dysplasias, including ectodermal dysplasia with syndactyly, ankyloblepharon-ectodermal defects-cleft lip and palate syndrome, Basan syndrome, cleft lip/palate-ectodermal dysplasia syndrome, ectodermal dysplasia 4, hair/nail type, ectodermal dysplasia with corkscrew hairs, ectrodactyly, ectodermal dysplasia, and cleft lip/palate syndrome 3, Goltz syndrome, hidrotic ectodermal dysplasia, hypohidrotic ectodermal dysplasia, hypotrichosis-osteolysis-periodontitis-palmoplantar keratoderma syndrome, oculo-dento-digital syndrome, pachyonychia congenita-2, Rapp-Hodgkin syndrome, Reeds syndrome, Salamon syndrome, Schöpf-Schulz-Passarge syndrome, and trichodysplasia-xeroderma.

Conditions associated with acquired pili torti include lichen planopilaris, frontal fibrosing alopecia, alopecia areata, central centrifugal cicatricial alopecia, discoid lupus erythematosus, dissecting cellulitis, folliculitis decalvans, pseudopelade of Brocq, traction alopecia, linear scleroderma en coup de sabre, repetitive trauma, scalp metastasis of breast cancer, cutaneous T-cell lymphoma, acne conglobate, anorexia nervosa, graft-vs.-host disease, hair transplantation, malnutrition, systemic sclerosis, and cataracts.

Drugs related to pili torti include epidermal growth factor receptor inhibitors, oral retinoids, sodium valproate, and carbamide perhydrate.

== Mechanism ==
Uneven growth of the outer root sheath cells is the source of hair twisting in hereditary forms. The hair shaft and inner root sheath are unevenly molded as a result of cell vacuolation and unequal outer root sheath thickness at the suprabulbar region. In acquired forms, the hair follicle is deformed and rotational forces are generated by a perifollicular inflammation followed by fibrosis.

== Diagnosis ==
Examination under a microscope and trichoscope is used to diagnose pili torti. Low magnification trichoscopy in pili torti reveals the hair shafts bent at random intervals and at varied angles. At high magnification, the hair shaft's regular twists along its long axis are visible. Upon microscopic inspection, the shaft exhibits irregularly spaced clusters of three or four twists at random intervals.

=== Classification ===
Pili torti can be acquired or inherited. There are three types of inherited pili torti: classic early onset (Ronchese type), late onset (Beare type), and pili torti linked to hereditary illnesses or disorders. Acquired pili torti may result from medication side effects or be linked to a variety of systemic and dermatological disorders.

== Treatment ==
Pili torti does not have a specific treatment. It is advised to keep the hair from suffering damage. Additional techniques of care include dyeing, braiding, heat treatments, avoiding over-grooming, and sleeping on a satin pillowcase. Shampoos that are gentle might be helpful.

After puberty, congenital pili torti may heal on their own. Drug-induced instances usually go away as the offending substance is stopped. The most crucial aspect of treating acquired pili torti is treating the underlying ailment.

The use of pharmaceuticals to treat pili torti has minimal efficacy. Topical minoxidil has been proposed as a good therapeutic alternative for individuals with higher fragility in their hair shaft abnormalities. Nevertheless, it does not cause a causative treatment; rather, it solely affects hair density.

== History ==
In 1932, Ronchese and Galewsky separately published the first descriptions of pili torti, also referred to as "twisted hair."

== See also ==
- List of cutaneous conditions
- Crandall syndrome
