= CDH17 =

Protein-coding gene in humans

Identifiers
- Aliases: CDH17, CDH16, HPT-1, HPT1, cadherin 17
- External IDs: OMIM: 603017; MGI: 1095414; GeneCards: CDH17

Gene location (Human)
Chr.	Chromosome 8 (human)
Band	8q22.1	Start	94,127,162 bp
Band	8q22.1	End	94,217,303 bp

Gene location (Mouse)
Chr.	Chromosome 4 (mouse)
Band	4|4 A1	Start	11,758,147 bp
Band	4|4 A1	End	11,817,895 bp
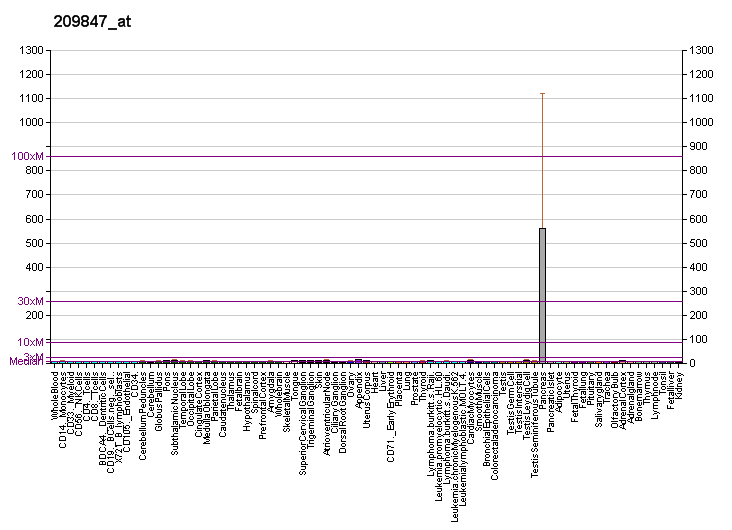
RNA expression pattern
Bgee	Human / Mouse (ortholog); Top expressed in: mucosa of colon; mucosa of sigmoid colon; mucosa of ileum; jejunal mucosa; rectum; mucosa of transverse colon; duodenum; pancreatic ductal cell; secondary oocyte; appendix / Top expressed in: ileum; intestinal villus; left colon; duodenum; epithelium of small intestine; crypt of lieberkuhn of small intestine; jejunum; migratory enteric neural crest cell; Paneth cell; zygote; More reference expression data
BioGPS	More reference expression data
Gene ontology
Molecular function	calcium ion binding; transporter activity; metal ion binding; integrin binding; proton-dependent oligopeptide secondary active transmembrane transporter activity; cytoskeletal protein binding; protein homodimerization activity; cadherin binding
Cellular component	integral component of membrane; membrane; cell surface; plasma membrane; basolateral plasma membrane; nucleus; cell junction; catenin complex
Biological process	spleen development; marginal zone B cell differentiation; integrin-mediated signaling pathway; positive regulation of integrin activation by cell surface receptor linked signal transduction; germinal center B cell differentiation; B cell differentiation; adherens junction organization; oligopeptide transport; calcium-dependent cell-cell adhesion via plasma membrane cell adhesion molecules; oligopeptide transmembrane transport; homophilic cell adhesion via plasma membrane adhesion molecules; cell adhesion; cell-cell junction assembly; cell-cell adhesion mediated by cadherin; cell-cell adhesion; cell morphogenesis
Sources:Amigo / QuickGO
Orthologs
Databases	NCBI: entry; OMA: entry
Species	Human	Mouse
Entrez	1015	12557
Ensembl	ENSG00000079112	ENSMUSG00000028217
UniProt	Q12864	Q9R100
RefSeq (mRNA)	NM_001144663; NM_004063	NM_019753
RefSeq (protein)	NP_001138135; NP_004054	NP_062727
Location (UCSC)	Chr 8: 94.13 – 94.22 Mb	Chr 4: 11.76 – 11.82 Mb
PubMed search
- Wikidata
View/Edit Human	View/Edit Mouse

Cadherin-17 is a protein that in humans is encoded by the CDH17 gene.

This gene is a member of the cadherin superfamily, genes encoding calcium-dependent, membrane-associated glycoproteins. The encoded protein is cadherin-like, consisting of an extracellular region, containing 7 cadherin domains, and a transmembrane region but lacking the conserved cytoplasmic domain. The protein is a component of the gastrointestinal tract and pancreatic ducts, acting as an intestinal proton-dependent peptide transporter in the first step in oral absorption of many medically important peptide-based drugs. The protein may also play a role in the morphological organization of liver and intestine.
