= Facial skeleton =

Facial bones of a skull

Facial bones
- The fourteen bones that form the human facial skeleton

- The fourteen facial bones. (Neurocranium is shown in semi-transparent.) Blue: Vomer (1) Yellow: Maxilla (2) Purple: Mandible (1) Pink: Nasal bones (2) Red: Palatine bones (2) Bright blue: Lacrimal bones (2) Dark green: Zygomatic bones (2) Bright green: Inferior nasal concha (2)

Details
- Part of: Face, skeleton

Identifiers
- Latin: ossa faciei, ossa facialia
- MeSH: D005147
- TA2: 356

The facial skeleton comprises the facial bones that may attach to build a portion of the skull. The remainder of the skull is the neurocranium.

In human anatomy and development, the facial skeleton is sometimes called the membranous viscerocranium, which comprises the mandible and dermatocranial elements that are not part of the braincase.

== Structure ==
In the human skull, the facial skeleton consists of fourteen bones in the face:

- Inferior turbinal (2)
- Lacrimal bones (2)
- Mandible
- Maxilla (2)
- Nasal bones (2)
- Palatine bones (2)
- Vomer
- Zygomatic bones (2)

=== Variations ===
Elements of the cartilaginous viscerocranium (i.e., splanchnocranial elements), such as the hyoid bone, are sometimes considered part of the facial skeleton. The ethmoid bone (or a part of it) and also the sphenoid bone are sometimes included, but otherwise considered part of the neurocranium. Because the maxillary bones are fused, they are often collectively listed as only one bone. The mandible is generally considered separately from the cranium.

=== Development ===
The facial skeleton is composed of dermal bone and derived from the neural crest cells (also responsible for the development of the neurocranium, teeth and adrenal medulla) or from the sclerotome, which derives from the somite block of the mesoderm. As with the neurocranium, in Chondricthyes and other cartilaginous vertebrates, they are not replaced via endochondral ossification.

Variation in craniofacial form between humans is largely due to differing patterns of biological inheritance. Cross-analysis of osteological variables and genome-wide SNPs has identified specific genes that control this craniofacial development. Of these genes, DCHS2, RUNX2, GLI3, PAX1 and PAX3 were found to determine nasal morphology, whereas EDAR impacts chin protrusion.

== Additional images ==
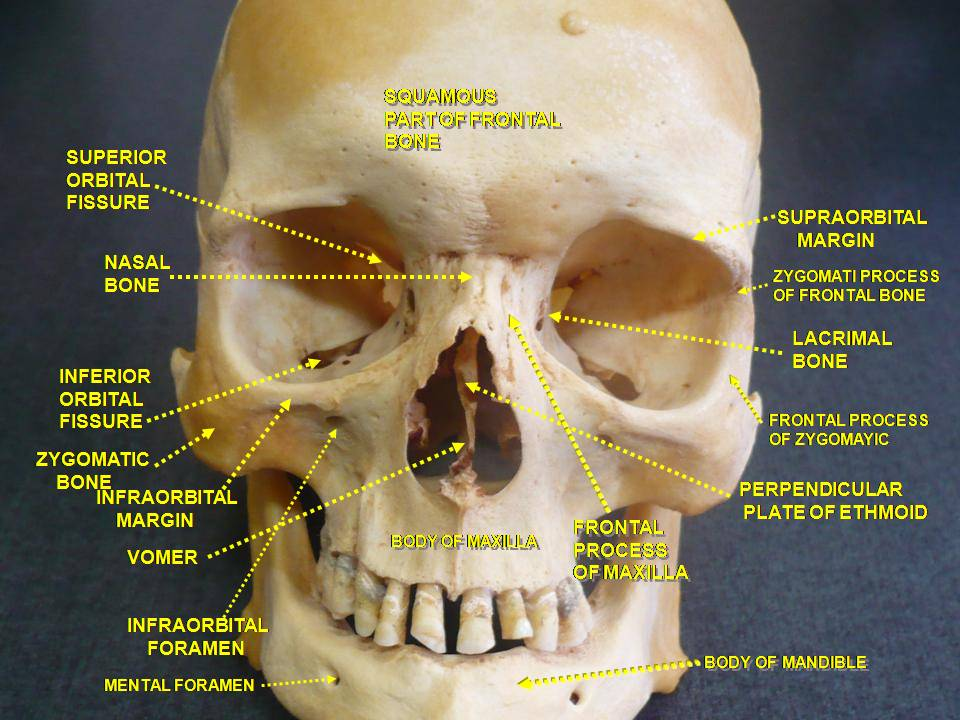
Human facial skeleton. Front view.

Human skull. Lateral view.

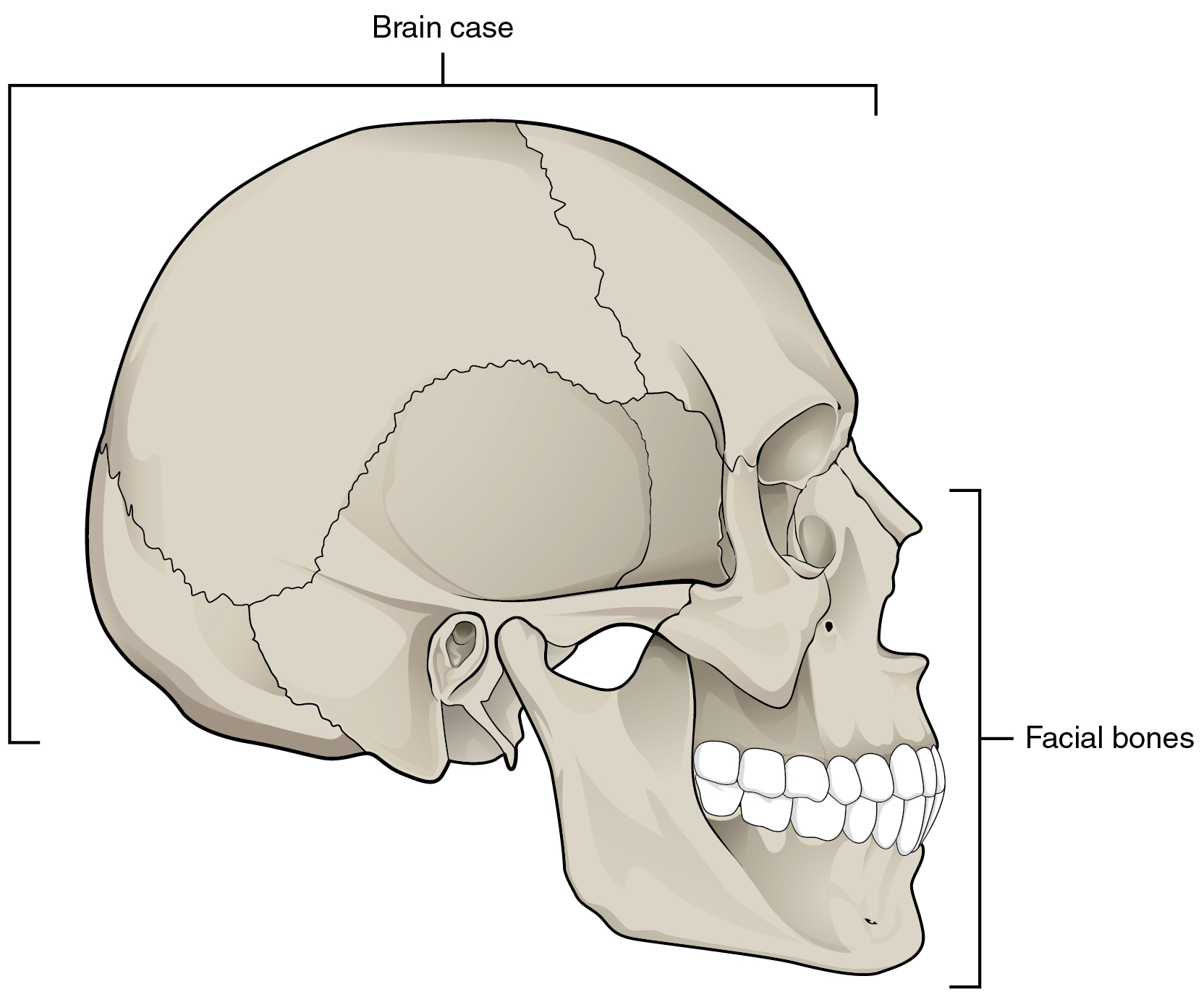
Facial bones and neurocranium (labeled as "Brain case").

3D model. Click to move.

== See also ==
- Axial skeleton
- Appendicular skeleton
