= CDH3 =

CDH3 may refer to:

- Cadherin 3, a human gene
- Finlay Air Park
