= LETM1-like protein family =

LETM1

Identifiers
- Symbol: LETM1
- Pfam: PF07766
- InterPro: IPR011685
- TCDB: 8.A.20
Available protein structures:
- Pfam: structures / ECOD
- PDB: RCSB PDB; PDBe; PDBj
- PDBsum: structure summary

LETM1-like is a family of evolutionarily related proteins. This is a group of mainly hypothetical eukaryotic proteins. Putative features found in LETM1, such as a transmembrane domain and a CK2 and PKC phosphorylation site, are relatively conserved throughout the family. Deletion of LETM1 is thought to be involved in the development of Wolf-Hirschhorn syndrome in humans. A member of this family, SWISSPROT, is known to be expressed in the mitochondria of Drosophila melanogaster, suggesting that this may be a group of mitochondrial proteins.

== Examples ==
Human gene encoding members of this family include:

- LETM1, LETM2, LETMD1
