= PCDHGC3 =

Protein-coding gene in the species Homo sapiens

Identifiers
- Aliases: PCDHGC3, PC43, PCDH-GAMMA-C3, PCDH2, protocadherin gamma subfamily C, 3
- External IDs: OMIM: 603627; MGI: 1935201; GeneCards: PCDHGC3

Gene location (Human)
Chr.	Chromosome 5 (human)
Band	5q31.3	Start	141,475,947 bp
Band	5q31.3	End	141,512,977 bp

Gene location (Mouse)
Chr.	Chromosome 18 (mouse)
Band	18 B3|18 19.67 cM	Start	37,939,417 bp
Band	18 B3|18 19.67 cM	End	37,974,926 bp
RNA expression pattern
Bgee	Human / Mouse (ortholog); Top expressed in: right frontal lobe; right hemisphere of cerebellum; anterior cingulate cortex; C1 segment; canal of the cervix; right lung; anterior pituitary; right coronary artery; upper lobe of left lung; ascending aorta / Top expressed in: ganglionic eminence; cerebellum; cerebellar cortex; white adipose tissue; olfactory bulb; striatum of neuraxis; lung; hippocampus proper; superior frontal gyrus; lip; More reference expression data
BioGPS	n/a
Gene ontology
Molecular function	calcium ion binding
Cellular component	integral component of membrane; plasma membrane; membrane; integral component of plasma membrane
Biological process	calcium-dependent cell-cell adhesion via plasma membrane cell adhesion molecules; homophilic cell adhesion via plasma membrane adhesion molecules; cell adhesion; cell-cell signaling; nervous system development; synapse organization
Sources:Amigo / QuickGO
Orthologs
Databases	NCBI: entry; OMA: entry
Species	Human	Mouse
Entrez	5098	93706
Ensembl	ENSG00000240184	ENSMUSG00000102918
UniProt	Q9UN70	n/a
RefSeq (mRNA)	NM_032403; NM_002588; NM_032402	NM_033581
RefSeq (protein)	NP_002579; NP_115778; NP_115779	n/a
Location (UCSC)	Chr 5: 141.48 – 141.51 Mb	Chr 18: 37.94 – 37.97 Mb
PubMed search
- Wikidata
View/Edit Human	View/Edit Mouse

Protocadherin gamma-C3 is a protein that in humans is encoded by the PCDHGC3 gene.

This gene is a member of the protocadherin gamma gene cluster, one of three related clusters tandemly linked on chromosome five. These gene clusters have an immunoglobulin-like organization, suggesting that a novel mechanism may be involved in their regulation and expression. The gamma gene cluster includes 22 genes divided into 3 subfamilies. Subfamily A contains 12 genes, subfamily B contains 7 genes and 2 pseudogenes, and the more distantly related subfamily C contains 3 genes. The tandem array of 22 large, variable region exons are followed by a constant region, containing 3 exons shared by all genes in the cluster. Each variable region exon encodes the extracellular region, which includes 6 cadherin ectodomains and a transmembrane region. The constant region exons encode the common cytoplasmic region. These neural cadherin-like cell adhesion proteins most likely play a critical role in the establishment and function of specific cell-cell connections in the brain. Alternative splicing has been described for the gamma cluster genes.
