= Crandall syndrome =

- Other names: Alopecia-deafness-hypogonadism syndrome
- Crandall syndrome is inherited in an autosomal recessive manner

Crandall syndrome is a very rare congenital disorder characterised by progressive sensorineural hearing loss, hair loss associated with pili torti, and hypogonadism demonstrated through low levels of luteinising hormone and growth hormone. It is thought to be an autosomal recessive disorder closely related to Björnstad syndrome which presents similarly but without hypogonadism.

The condition was first reported by B. F. Crandall in 1973.
