= PCDH18 =

Protein-coding gene in the species Homo sapiens

Identifiers
- Aliases: PCDH18, PCDH68L, protocadherin 18
- External IDs: OMIM: 608287; MGI: 1920423; GeneCards: PCDH18

Gene location (Human)
Chr.	Chromosome 4 (human)
Band	4q28.3	Start	137,518,918 bp
Band	4q28.3	End	137,532,494 bp

Gene location (Mouse)
Chr.	Chromosome 3 (mouse)
Band	3|3 C	Start	49,697,745 bp
Band	3|3 C	End	49,711,774 bp
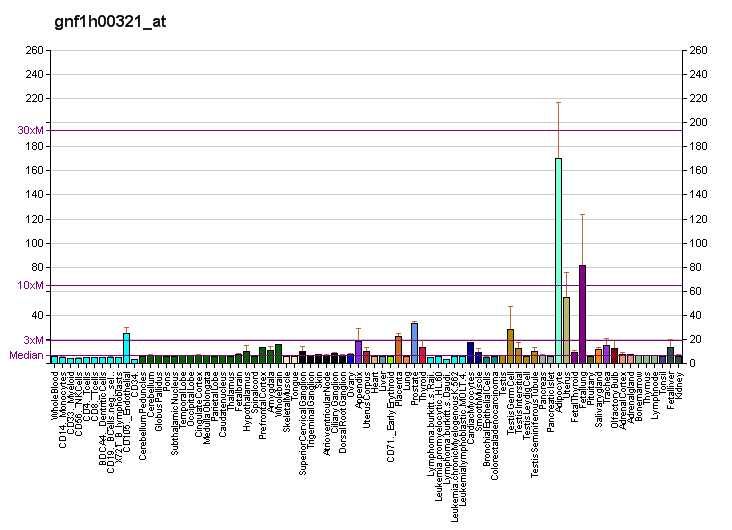
RNA expression pattern
Bgee	Human / Mouse (ortholog); Top expressed in: stromal cell of endometrium; Achilles tendon; parietal pleura; lactiferous duct; mucosa of ileum; retinal pigment epithelium; tibia; placenta; skin of hip; visceral pleura / Top expressed in: hand; maxillary prominence; genital tubercle; mandibular prominence; dermis; human fetus; left lung lobe; molar; Gonadal ridge; foot; More reference expression data
BioGPS	More reference expression data
Gene ontology
Molecular function	calcium ion binding
Cellular component	integral component of membrane; plasma membrane; membrane; integral component of plasma membrane
Biological process	brain development; homophilic cell adhesion via plasma membrane adhesion molecules; cell adhesion; cell-cell signaling; nervous system development
Sources:Amigo / QuickGO
Orthologs
Databases	NCBI: entry; OMA: entry
Species	Human	Mouse
Entrez	54510	73173
Ensembl	ENSG00000189184	ENSMUSG00000037892
UniProt	Q9HCL0	Q8VHR0
RefSeq (mRNA)	NM_001300828; NM_019035	NM_130448
RefSeq (protein)	NP_001287757; NP_061908	NP_569715; NP_001391291; NP_001391292; NP_001391293; NP_001391295 NP_001391296; NP_001391306
Location (UCSC)	Chr 4: 137.52 – 137.53 Mb	Chr 3: 49.7 – 49.71 Mb
PubMed search
- Wikidata
View/Edit Human	View/Edit Mouse

Protocadherin-18 is a protein that in humans is encoded by the PCDH18 gene.

This gene belongs to the protocadherin gene family, a subfamily of the cadherin superfamily. This gene encodes a protein which contains 6 extracellular cadherin domains, a transmembrane domain and a cytoplasmic tail differing from those of the classical cadherins. Although its specific function is undetermined, the cadherin-related neuronal receptor is thought to play a role in the establishment and function of specific cell-cell connections in the brain.
