= Björnstad syndrome =

- Other names: BJS, Deafness and pili torti (Bjornstad type), Pili torti and nerve deafness, Pili-torti deafness syndrome, Pili torti-sensorineural hearing loss, PTD
- Symptoms: Pili torti, hearing loss, alopecia, mental retardation
- Usual onset: Infancy or early childhood
- Causes: Mutation of BCS1L
- Frequency: Extremely rare - less than 50 documented cases

Björnstad syndrome is inherited in an autosomal recessive pattern.

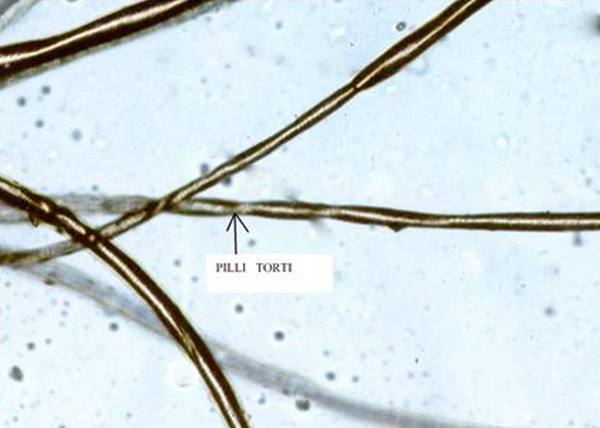
Microscopic image of pili torti

Björnstad syndrome is an autosomal recessive congenital condition involving pili torti, sensorineural deafness, and hair abnormalities. It was first characterized in 1965, in Oslo, by Professor Roar Theodor Bjørnstad after he observed an association between pili torti and hearing loss. The condition is extremely rare, with less than 50 cases documented in medical literature worldwide.

Björnstad syndrome is caused by mutations of the BCS1L gene. The protein product of this gene is BCS1L, which plays an important role in oxidative phosphorylation. Mutated BCS1L increases production of reactive oxygen species, which may be the molecular cause of pili torti and hearing loss, both of which are associated with Björnstad syndrome. Pili torti is recognized in early childhood and is characterized by twisted hair shafts and brittle hair. The hearing loss usually becomes evident very early in life as well, often in the first year.

== Signs and symptoms ==
The two major symptoms of Björnstad syndrome are pili torti and sensorineural hearing impairment. These two symptoms typically appear before the age of 2 and are present in 80-99% of individuals with Björnstad syndrome. Approximately 5-29% of individuals also experience intellectual disabilities and hypogonadism. Cases showing lack of hair pigmentation and anhidrosis have also been documented.

Pili torti is a hair abnormality characterized by twisted hair shafts. In Björnstad syndrome patients, the hair usually appears dry, fragile, coarse, and is easily broken. In some patients, hair abnormalities only affect hair on the head, although cases affecting eyebrows, eyelashes, and hair on other parts of the body have been documented. Weakening of the hair associated with pili torti also causes alopecia in approximately 80% of patients.

The severity of hearing loss associated with Björnstad syndrome varies. Some individuals are unable to hear sounds at certain frequencies, while others are completely deaf. Their hearing loss is caused by tissue damage of the inner ear.

== Genetics ==
Björnstad syndrome is caused by a mutation in the BCS1L gene (position 2pq35) and is inherited in an autosomal recessive pattern. BCS1L is a protein that adds Rieske Fe/S to complex III during oxidative phosphorylation of cellular respiration. Mutations of BCS1L gene prevents the protein product from aiding in complex III formation, which reduces oxidative phosphorylation and increases the production of reactive oxygen species.

Two missense mutations linked to Björnstad syndrome have been documented, but several other variants are suspected to be pathogenic. The clinical severity of different BCS1L mutations may be caused by the varying production of reactive oxygen species. The symptoms of Björnstad syndrome may be attributed to a particular sensitivity of inner ear and hair tissues to reactive oxygen species, but more research is needed. Mutations of the BCS1L gene may also result in GRACILE syndrome, which is an inherited lethal metabolic disease.

== Diagnosis ==
Roar Theodor Björnstad first noticed a correlation between pilli torti and hearing loss in 1965, and subsequently diagnosed eight patients with Björnstad syndrome. Out of these eight patients with pili torti, five experienced sensorineural deafness. Björnstad presented his diagnosis and observations at a medical conference in Copenhagen.

Björnstad syndrome is diagnosed by observation of twisted hair, known as pili torti, which can be observed as early as birth. To confirm presence of pili torti, the hair shafts of an individual are examined under an electron microscope. Any infants with confirmed pili torti should undergo a series of auditory tests to evaluate potential sensorineural deafness. Finally, a diagnosis of Björnstad syndrome can be confirmed by genetic testing for mutations in the BCS1L gene.

== Epidemiology ==
Björnstad syndrome is extremely rare, with less than 50 documented cases worldwide. In 2013, five individuals from a consanguineous Pakistani family were diagnosed with Björnstad syndrome. They each experienced a varying degree of progressive hearing loss as well as hair loss on the scalp. The males with Björnstad syndrome also experienced shorter stature.

Given its autosomal recessive inheritance pattern, Björnstad syndrome should theoretically affect males and females in equal numbers. However, more females than males have been diagnosed with Björnstad syndrome in medical literature.

== See also ==
- GRACILE syndrome
- Mitochondrial complex III deficiency
