= PCDHA3 =

Protein-coding gene in the species Homo sapiens

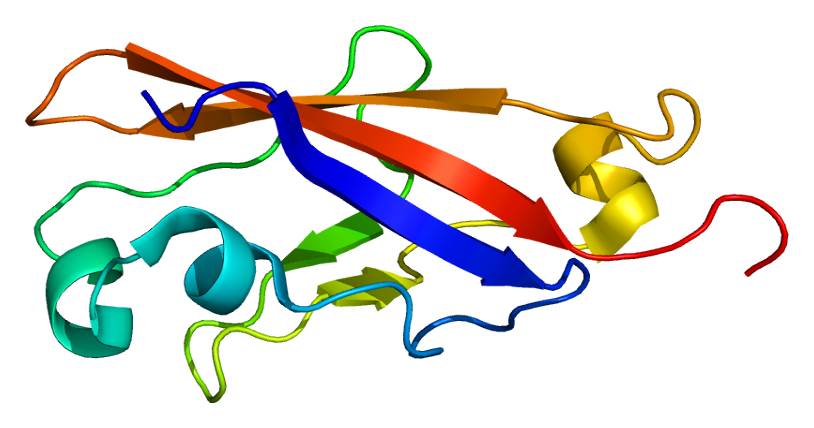

Identifiers
- Aliases: PCDHA3, PCDH-ALPHA3, protocadherin alpha 3
- External IDs: OMIM: 606309; MGI: 2447313; GeneCards: PCDHA3

Gene location (Human)
Chr.	Chromosome 5 (human)
Band	5q31.3	Start	140,801,028 bp
Band	5q31.3	End	141,012,347 bp

Gene location (Mouse)
Chr.	Chromosome 18 (mouse)
Band	18|18 B2- B3	Start	37,079,158 bp
Band	18|18 B2- B3	End	37,320,710 bp
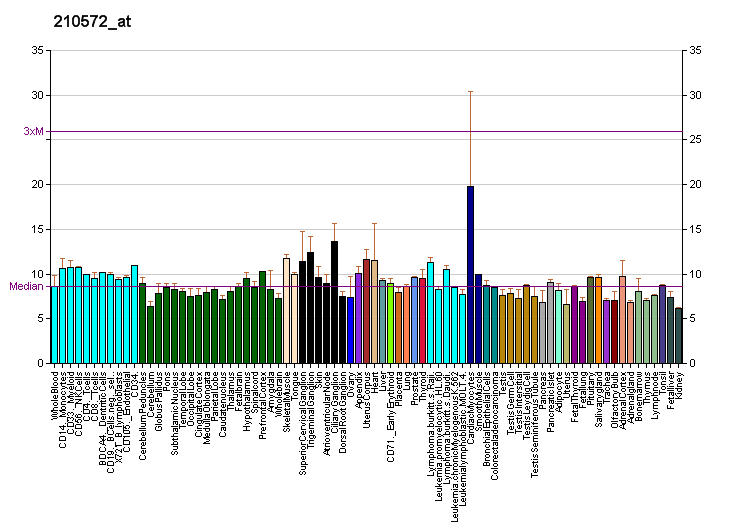

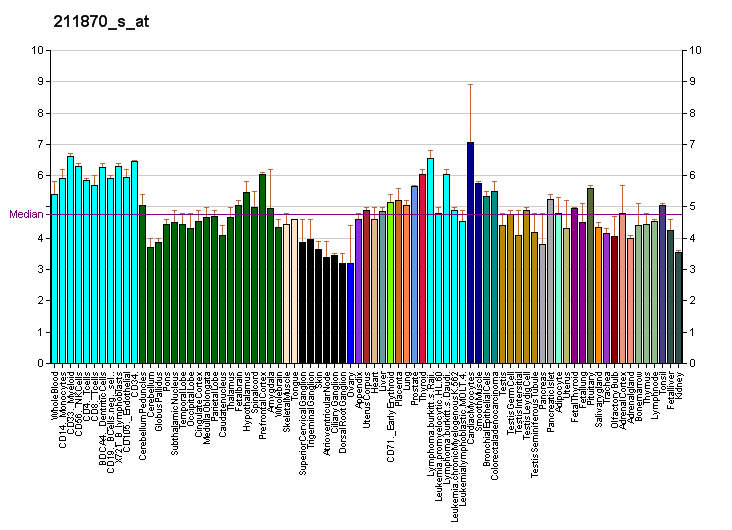
RNA expression pattern
Bgee	Human / Mouse (ortholog); Top expressed in: islet of Langerhans; ganglionic eminence; prefrontal cortex; right hemisphere of cerebellum; stromal cell of endometrium; Brodmann area 9; body of uterus; C1 segment; right coronary artery; ventricular zone / Top expressed in: dentate gyrus of hippocampal formation granule cell; neural tube; hippocampus proper; ganglionic eminence; cerebellar cortex; Cortex of frontal lobe; mesencephalon; primary visual cortex; superior frontal gyrus; olfactory bulb; More reference expression data
BioGPS	More reference expression data
Gene ontology
Molecular function	calcium ion binding
Cellular component	integral component of membrane; plasma membrane; integral component of plasma membrane; membrane
Biological process	cell adhesion; nervous system development; homophilic cell adhesion via plasma membrane adhesion molecules; cell-cell signaling
Sources:Amigo / QuickGO
Orthologs
Databases	NCBI: entry; OMA: entry
Species	Human	Mouse
Entrez	56145	192163
Ensembl	ENSG00000255408	ENSMUSG00000102312
UniProt	Q9Y5H8	Q91Y16
RefSeq (mRNA)	NM_031497; NM_018906	NM_138662
RefSeq (protein)	NP_061729; NP_113685	NP_619603
Location (UCSC)	Chr 5: 140.8 – 141.01 Mb	Chr 18: 37.08 – 37.32 Mb
PubMed search
- Wikidata
View/Edit Human	View/Edit Mouse

Protocadherin alpha-3 is a protein that in humans is encoded by the PCDHA3 gene.

This gene is a member of the protocadherin alpha gene cluster, one of three related gene clusters tandemly linked on chromosome 5 that demonstrate an unusual genomic organization similar to that of B-cell and T-cell receptor gene clusters.

The alpha gene cluster is composed of 15 cadherin superfamily genes related to the mouse CNR genes and consists of 13 highly similar and 2 more distantly related coding sequences. The tandem array of 15 N-terminal exons, or variable exons, are followed by downstream C-terminal exons, or constant exons, which are shared by all genes in the cluster. The large, uninterrupted N-terminal exons each encode six cadherin ectodomains while the C-terminal exons encode the cytoplasmic domain.

These neural cadherin-like cell adhesion proteins are integral plasma membrane proteins that most likely play a critical role in the establishment and function of specific cell-cell connections in the brain. Alternative splicing has been observed and additional variants have been suggested but their full-length nature has yet to be determined.
