= Ectodermal dysplasia with corkscrew hairs =

- Specialty: Dermatology

Ectodermal dysplasia with corkscrew hairs is a skin condition with salient features including exaggerated pili torti, scalp keloids, follicular plugging, keratosis pilaris, xerosis, eczema, palmoplantar keratoderma, syndactyly, onychodysplasia and conjunctival neovascularization.

== See also ==
- Skin lesion
