= EEM syndrome =

- EEM syndrome has an autosomal recessive pattern of inheritance.
- Specialty: Medical genetics

EEM syndrome (or Ectodermal dysplasia, Ectrodactyly and Macular dystrophy syndrome) is an autosomal recessive congenital malformation disorder affecting tissues associated with the ectoderm (skin, hair, nails, teeth), and also the hands, feet and eyes.

== Presentation ==
EEM syndrome exhibits a combination of prominent symptoms and features. These include: ectodermal dysplasia (systemic malformations of ectodermal tissues), ectrodactyly ("lobster claw" deformity in the hands and feet), macular dystrophy (a progressive eye disease), syndactyly (webbed fingers or toes), hypotrichosis (a type of hair-loss), and dental abnormalities (hypodontia).

== Pathophysiology ==
EEM syndrome is caused by mutations in the P-cadherin gene (CDH3). Distinct mutations in CDH3 (located on human chromosome 16) are responsible for the macular dystrophy and spectrum of malformations found in EEM syndrome, due in part to developmental errors caused by the resulting inability of CDH3 to respond correctly to the P-cadherin transcription factor p63.

The gene for p63 (TP73L, found on human chromosome 3) may also play a role in EEM syndrome. Mutations in this gene are associated with the symptoms of EEM and similar disorders, particularly ectrodactyly.

EEM syndrome is an autosomal recessive disorder, which means the defective gene is located on an autosome, and two copies of the defective gene - one from each parent - are required to inherit the disorder. The parents of an individual with an autosomal recessive disorder both carry one copy of the defective gene, but usually do not experience any signs or symptoms of the disorder.

== See also ==
- Germ layer
- Integumentary system
- Hay-Wells syndrome
