= PTTG1IP =

Protein-coding gene in the species Homo sapiens

Identifiers
- Aliases: PTTG1IP, C21orf1, C21orf3, PBF, pituitary tumor-transforming 1 interacting protein, PTTG1 interacting protein, PTTG1IP1
- External IDs: OMIM: 603784; MGI: 2652132; HomoloGene: 3203; GeneCards: PTTG1IP; OMA:PTTG1IP - orthologs

Gene location (Human)
Chr.	Chromosome 21 (human)
Band	21q22.3	Start	44,849,585 bp
Band	21q22.3	End	44,873,903 bp

Gene location (Mouse)
Chr.	Chromosome 10 (mouse)
Band	10|10 C1	Start	77,417,554 bp
Band	10|10 C1	End	77,434,566 bp
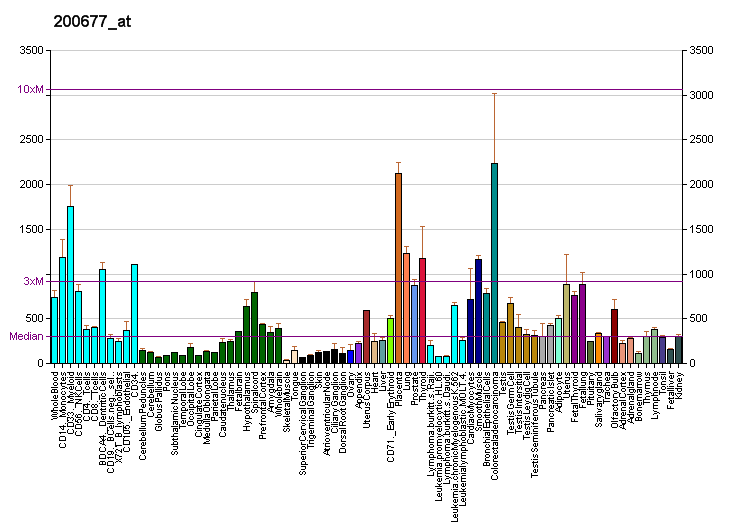
RNA expression pattern
Bgee	Human / Mouse (ortholog); Top expressed in: visceral pleura; tibia; parietal pleura; cartilage tissue; palpebral conjunctiva; placenta; decidua; parotid gland; right coronary artery; bronchial epithelial cell / Top expressed in: epithelium of stomach; ascending aorta; aortic valve; transitional epithelium of urinary bladder; mucous cell of stomach; decidua; utricle; tunica media of zone of aorta; endothelial cell of lymphatic vessel; ciliary body; More reference expression data
BioGPS	More reference expression data
Gene ontology
Molecular function	p53 binding; protein binding; molecular function
Cellular component	cytoplasm; integral component of membrane; extracellular exosome; membrane; nucleus; nucleoplasm
Biological process	negative regulation of DNA damage response, signal transduction by p53 class mediator; positive regulation of protein ubiquitination; negative regulation of intrinsic apoptotic signaling pathway by p53 class mediator; protein import into nucleus
Sources:Amigo / QuickGO
Orthologs
Species	Human	Mouse
Entrez	754	108705
Ensembl	ENSG00000183255	ENSMUSG00000009291
UniProt	P53801	Q8R143
RefSeq (mRNA)	NM_001286822; NM_004339	NM_145925
RefSeq (protein)	NP_001273751; NP_004330	NP_666037
Location (UCSC)	Chr 21: 44.85 – 44.87 Mb	Chr 10: 77.42 – 77.43 Mb
PubMed search
- Wikidata
View/Edit Human	View/Edit Mouse

Pituitary tumor-transforming gene 1 protein-interacting protein (PTTG1), also known as PTTG1-binding factor (PBF), is a poorly characterised protein that in humans is encoded by the PTTG1IP gene located within the chromosomal region 21q22.3.

== Structure ==
The encoded protein is composed of 180 amino acids and has a predicted molecular mass of 22 kDa. The peptide sequence shares no significant homology with any other human proteins but is highly conserved across a wide diversity of animal species, suggesting both unique function and evolutionary importance. Initial protein prediction studies suggested that PTTG1IP was a cell surface glycoprotein, however, the recent identification of a nuclear localisation signal (NLS) suggests that it may have a role both in the cytoplasm and as a nuclear protein.

== Function ==
Although PTTG1IP is ubiquitously expressed in normal human tissues, its exact function remains elusive. It has been shown to directly interact with the human securin and proto-oncogene, PTTG1, thus facilitating its nuclear translocation and the subsequent transcriptional activation of basic fibroblast growth factor (bFGF) by PTTG1.

Further evidence suggests that PTTG1IP may have a direct role in cancer. Initially, PTTG1IP expression was found to be higher in pituitary tumours compared with normal pituitary tissue. In particular, PTTG1IP has been shown to regulate thyroid cell growth, with overexpression resulting in hyperplasia and the formation of lesions within the thyroid gland. PTTG1IP expression has also been independently associated with tumour recurrence and subcutaneous expression results in tumour formation in nude mice.

PTTG1IP is also implicated in breast cancer. Immunohistochemical analysis of tissue samples has revealed that PTTG1IP is strongly expressed in several types and grades of breast cancer. Furthermore, overexpression and secretion of PTTG1IP induces cell invasion, a process that is essential for the formation of metastatic disease.

Furthermore, PTTG1IP has been reported to regulate the expression of the human sodium-iodide symporter (NIS). NIS is expressed by thyroid follicular epithelial cells and is responsible for iodine transport and uptake. The ability of the thyroid to accumulate iodine provides the basis for radioiodine ablation of thyroid tumours and their metastases. Overexpression of PTTG1 or PTTG1IP inhibits NIS mRNA expression and iodide uptake in human and rat thyroid cells. This has important implications for radioiodine ablation therapy and highlights PTTG1IP as a novel target for improving radioiodine uptake by thyroid tumours.

== Interactions ==
PTTG1IP has been shown to interact with:

- PTTG1,
- MCT8, and
- NIS.
