= PTTG1 =

Protein-coding gene in the species Homo sapiens

Identifiers
- Aliases: PTTG1, EAP1, HPTTG, PTTG, TUTR1, pituitary tumor-transforming 1, PTTG1 regulator of sister chromatid separation, securin, ECRAR
- External IDs: OMIM: 604147; MGI: 1353578; GeneCards: PTTG1

Gene location (Human)
| Chr. | Chromosome 5 (human) |
| Band | 5q33.3 | Start | 160,421,855 bp |
| Band | 5q33.3 | End | 160,428,739 bp |

Gene location (Mouse)
| Chr. | Chromosome 11 (mouse) |
| Band | 11|11 B1.1 | Start | 43,311,077 bp |
| Band | 11|11 B1.1 | End | 43,317,078 bp |
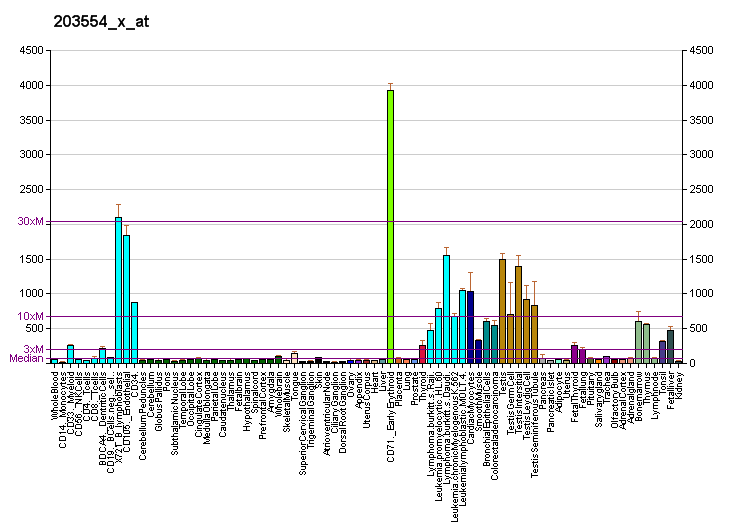
RNA expression pattern
| Bgee | Human / Mouse (ortholog); Top expressed in: secondary oocyte; ventricular zone; left testis; ganglionic eminence; right testis; sperm; gingival epithelium; trabecular bone; bone marrow; mucosa of esophagus / Top expressed in: ciliary body; secondary oocyte; zygote; retinal pigment epithelium; primary oocyte; iris; blood; primitive streak; ankle; otic placode; More reference expression data |
| BioGPS | More reference expression data |
Gene ontology
| Molecular function | peptidase inhibitor activity; cysteine-type endopeptidase inhibitor activity; DNA-binding transcription factor activity; SH3 domain binding; protein binding; DNA-binding transcription factor activity, RNA polymerase II-specific |
| Cellular component | cytoplasm; nucleus; cytosol |
| Biological process | chromosome segregation; chromosome organization; homologous chromosome segregation; cellular response to DNA damage stimulus; cell division; spermatogenesis; cell cycle; anaphase-promoting complex-dependent catabolic process; DNA repair; regulation of transcription, DNA-templated; negative regulation of peptidase activity; negative regulation of endopeptidase activity; regulation of transcription by RNA polymerase II; transcription by RNA polymerase II; negative regulation of mitotic sister chromatid separation; ubiquitin-dependent protein catabolic process |
Sources:Amigo / QuickGO
Orthologs
| Databases | NCBI: entry; OMA: entry |
| Species | Human | Mouse |
| Entrez | 9232 | 30939 |
| Ensembl | ENSG00000164611 | ENSMUSG00000020415 |
| UniProt | O95997; Q6IAL9 | Q9CQJ7 |
| RefSeq (mRNA) | NM_004219; NM_001282382; NM_001282383 | NM_001131054; NM_013917; NM_001362799 |
| RefSeq (protein) | NP_001269311; NP_001269312; NP_004210; NP_001269311.1; NP_001269312.1 NP_004210.1 | NP_001124526; NP_038945; NP_001349728 |
| Location (UCSC) | Chr 5: 160.42 – 160.43 Mb | Chr 11: 43.31 – 43.32 Mb |
| PubMed search |
- Wikidata
| View/Edit Human | View/Edit Mouse |

Securin is a protein that in humans is encoded by the PTTG1 gene.

== Function ==
The encoded protein is a homolog of yeast securin proteins, which prevent separins from promoting sister chromatid separation. It is an anaphase-promoting complex (APC) substrate that associates with a separin until activation of the APC. The gene product has transforming activity in vitro and tumorigenic activity in vivo, and the gene is highly expressed in various tumors. The gene product contains 2 PXXP motifs, which are required for its transforming and tumorigenic activities, as well as for its stimulation of basic fibroblast growth factor expression. It also contains a destruction box (D box) that is required for its degradation by the APC. The acidic C-terminal region of the encoded protein can act as a transactivation domain. The gene product is mainly a cytosolic protein, although it partially localizes in the nucleus.

== Interactions ==
PTTG1 has been shown to interact with:

- DNAJA1,
- Ku70
- P53,
- PTTG1IP, and
- RPS10.

== Regulation ==
During Mitosis CDK1 phosphorylate PTTG1 at Ser-165. PTTG1 is down-regulated in melanoma cells in response to the cyclin-dependent kinase inhibitor PHA-848125.
