= CDH3 (gene) =

Protein-coding gene in humans

Identifiers
- Aliases: CDH3, CDHP, HJMD, PCAD, cadherin 3
- External IDs: OMIM: 114021; MGI: 88356; GeneCards: CDH3
Available structures
PDB	Ortholog search: PDBe RCSB
PDB	List of PDB id codes 4OY9

Gene location (Human)
Chr.	Chromosome 16 (human)
Band	16q22.1	Start	68,636,189 bp
Band	16q22.1	End	68,727,468 bp

Gene location (Mouse)
Chr.	Chromosome 8 (mouse)
Band	8 D3|8 53.16 cM	Start	107,237,523 bp
Band	8 D3|8 53.16 cM	End	107,283,929 bp
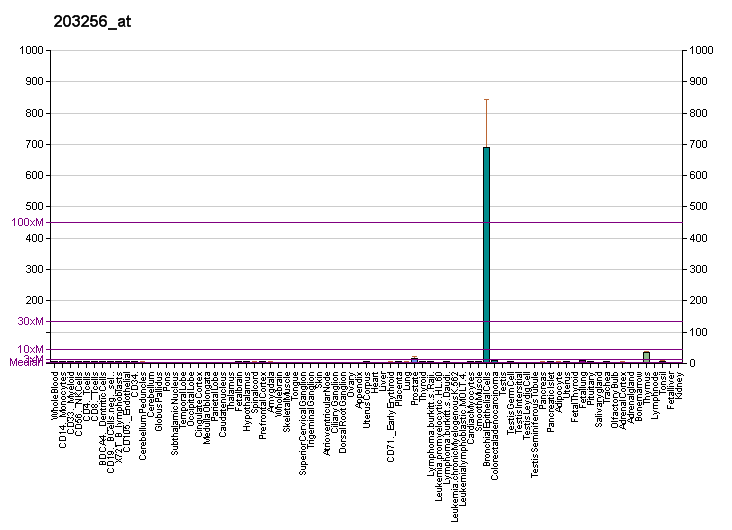
RNA expression pattern
Bgee	Human / Mouse (ortholog); Top expressed in: secondary oocyte; lactiferous duct; gingival epithelium; olfactory zone of nasal mucosa; left ovary; retinal pigment epithelium; nasal epithelium; periodontal fiber; right ovary; hair follicle / Top expressed in: decidua; gastrula; choroid plexus of fourth ventricle; genital tubercle; tail of embryo; lip; otic vesicle; saccule; secondary oocyte; molar; More reference expression data
BioGPS	More reference expression data
Gene ontology
Molecular function	calcium ion binding; metal ion binding; molecular function; cytoskeletal protein binding; protein homodimerization activity; cadherin binding
Cellular component	cytoplasm; integral component of membrane; membrane; plasma membrane; cell surface; catenin complex
Biological process	hair cycle process; positive regulation of keratinocyte proliferation; negative regulation of timing of catagen; response to stimulus; keratinization; wound healing; regulation of hair cycle by canonical Wnt signaling pathway; negative regulation of transforming growth factor beta2 production; positive regulation of tyrosinase activity; retina homeostasis; positive regulation of gene expression; cell adhesion; positive regulation of insulin-like growth factor receptor signaling pathway; canonical Wnt signaling pathway; positive regulation of melanin biosynthetic process; positive regulation of melanosome transport; adherens junction organization; visual perception; homophilic cell adhesion via plasma membrane adhesion molecules; cell-cell adhesion; positive regulation of canonical Wnt signaling pathway; cell-cell junction assembly; calcium-dependent cell-cell adhesion via plasma membrane cell adhesion molecules; cell-cell adhesion mediated by cadherin; cell morphogenesis
Sources:Amigo / QuickGO
Orthologs
Databases	NCBI: entry; OMA: entry
Species	Human	Mouse
Entrez	1001	12560
Ensembl	ENSG00000062038	ENSMUSG00000061048
UniProt	P22223	P10287
RefSeq (mRNA)	NM_001793; NM_001317195; NM_001317196	NM_001037809; NM_007665
RefSeq (protein)	NP_001304124; NP_001304125; NP_001784	NP_001032898; NP_031691
Location (UCSC)	Chr 16: 68.64 – 68.73 Mb	Chr 8: 107.24 – 107.28 Mb
PubMed search
- Wikidata
View/Edit Human	View/Edit Mouse

Cadherin-3, also known as P-Cadherin, is a protein that in humans is encoded by the CDH3 gene.

== Function ==
This gene is a classical cadherin from the cadherin superfamily. The encoded protein is a calcium-dependent cell-cell adhesion glycoprotein composed of five extracellular cadherin repeats, a transmembrane region and a highly conserved cytoplasmic tail. This gene is located in a six-cadherin cluster in a region on the long arm of chromosome 16 that is involved in loss of heterozygosity events in breast and prostate cancer. In addition, aberrant expression of this protein is observed in cervical adenocarcinomas.

== Clinical significance ==
Mutations in this gene have been associated with congenital hypotrichosis with juvenile macular dystrophy.

== Interactions ==
CDH3 (gene) has been shown to interact with:

- Beta-catenin,
- CDH1,
- Catenin (cadherin-associated protein), alpha 1,
- Nephrin and
- Plakoglobin.

== History ==
Cadherin-3 was first described in 1986 by Masatoshi Takeichi's laboratory as a new cadherin molecule most abundant in the developing mouse placenta – hence "P-cadherin".

== See also ==
- EEM syndrome
