= Symblepharon =

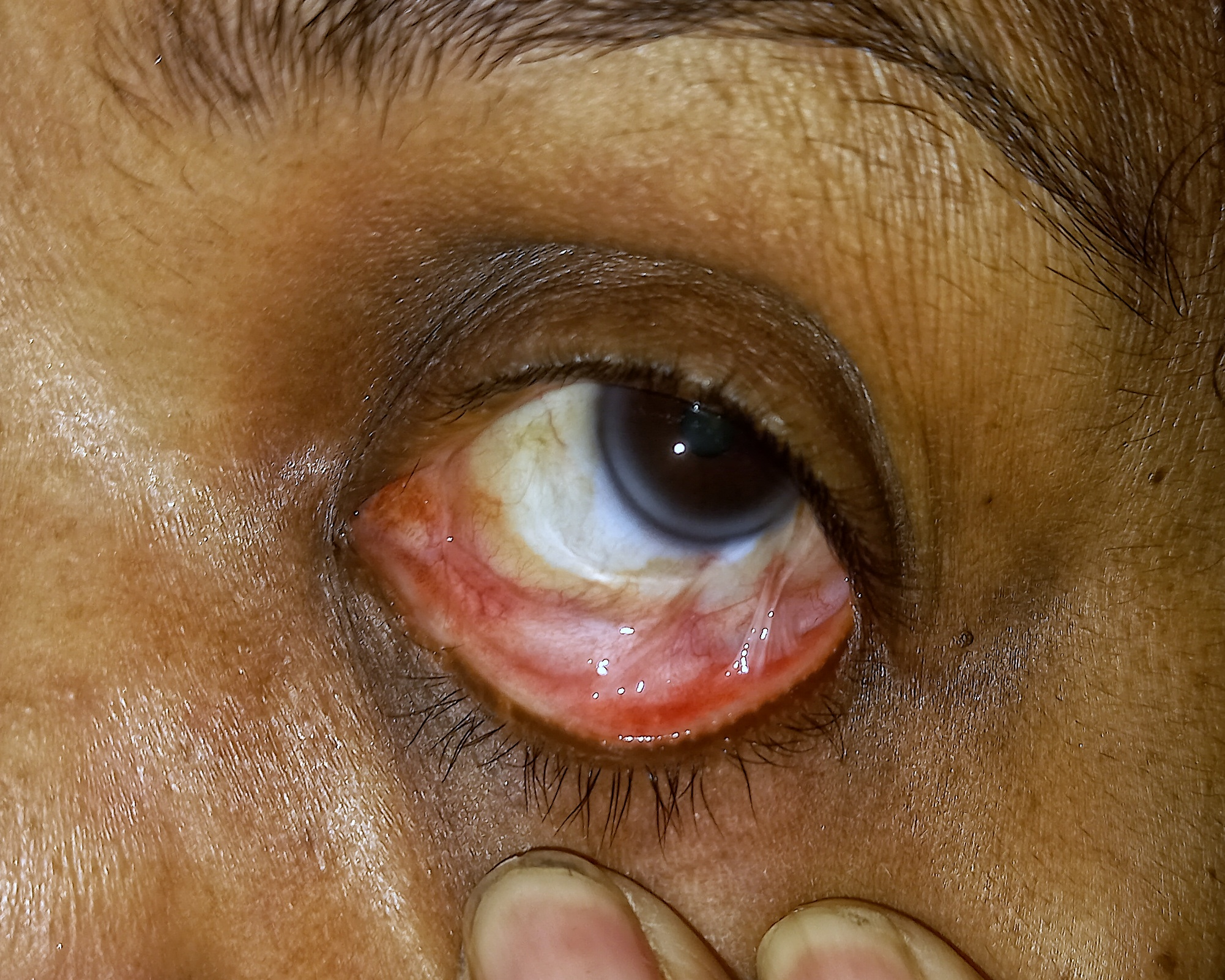
- Symblepharon in lower conjunciva caused by chemical eye burn
- Differential diagnosis: trachoma

A symblepharon is a partial or complete adhesion of the palpebral conjunctiva of the eyelid to the bulbar conjunctiva of the eyeball. It results either from disease (conjunctival sequelae of trachoma) or trauma. Cicatricial pemphigoid and, in severe cases, rosacea may cause symblepharon. Congenital symblepharon may be seen with cryptophthalmos. Its treatment is symblepharectomy.

== See also ==
- Ankyloblepharon
