= 40S ribosomal protein S10 =

Protein-coding gene in the species Homo sapiens

RPS10

Identifiers
- Aliases: RPS10, DBA9, S10, ribosomal protein S10
- External IDs: OMIM: 603632; MGI: 1914347; GeneCards: RPS10
Available structures
PDB	Ortholog search: PDBe RCSB
PDB	List of PDB id codes 4UG0, 4V6X, 5A2Q, 5AJ0, 5FLX

Gene location (Human)
Chr.	Chromosome 6 (human)
Band	6p21.31	Start	34,417,454 bp
Band	6p21.31	End	34,426,069 bp

Gene location (Mouse)
Chr.	Chromosome 17 (mouse)
Band	17|17 A3.3	Start	27,849,392 bp
Band	17|17 A3.3	End	27,855,643 bp
RNA expression pattern
Bgee	Human / Mouse (ortholog); Top expressed in: gonad; left ovary; right ovary; right uterine tube; canal of the cervix; lymph node; skin of abdomen; skin of leg; ectocervix; body of uterus / Top expressed in: saccule; medial ganglionic eminence; Gonadal ridge; migratory enteric neural crest cell; otic placode; condyle; otic vesicle; fossa; mesenteric lymph nodes; vas deferens; More reference expression data
BioGPS	n/a
Gene ontology
Molecular function	structural constituent of ribosome; protein binding; RNA binding
Cellular component	cytoplasm; ribosome; membrane; focal adhesion; cytosolic small ribosomal subunit; nucleolus; extracellular exosome; nucleus; nucleoplasm; extracellular matrix; cytosol
Biological process	viral transcription; SRP-dependent cotranslational protein targeting to membrane; translational initiation; ribosomal small subunit assembly; nuclear-transcribed mRNA catabolic process, nonsense-mediated decay; protein biosynthesis; rRNA processing
Sources:Amigo / QuickGO
Orthologs
Databases	NCBI: entry; OMA: entry
Species	Human	Mouse
Entrez	6204	67097
Ensembl	ENSG00000124614	ENSMUSG00000052146
UniProt	P46783	P63325
RefSeq (mRNA)	NM_001204091; NM_001014; NM_001203245	NM_025963; NM_001364934
RefSeq (protein)	NP_001005; NP_001190174; NP_001191020	NP_080239; NP_001351863
Location (UCSC)	Chr 6: 34.42 – 34.43 Mb	Chr 17: 27.85 – 27.86 Mb
PubMed search
- Wikidata
View/Edit Human	View/Edit Mouse

40S ribosomal protein S10 is a protein that in humans is encoded by the RPS10 gene.

== Function ==
Ribosomes, the organelles that catalyze protein synthesis, consist of a small 40S subunit and a large 60S subunit. Together these subunits are composed of 4 RNA species and approximately 80 structurally distinct proteins. This gene encodes a ribosomal protein that is a component of the 40S subunit. The protein belongs to the S10E family of ribosomal proteins. It is located in the cytoplasm. As is typical for genes encoding ribosomal proteins, there are multiple processed pseudogenes of this gene dispersed through the genome.

== Clinical significance ==
Variable expression of this gene in colorectal cancers compared to adjacent normal tissues has been observed, although no correlation between the level of expression and the severity of the disease has been found. Mutations in the RPS10 gene can cause Diamond–Blackfan anemia, a congenital anemia sometimes associated with bone marrow failure.

== Interactions ==
RPS10 has been shown to interact with PTTG1.
