= Rapp–Hodgkin syndrome =

- This condition is inherited in an autosomal dominant manner.
- Specialty: Medical genetics

Rapp–Hodgkin syndrome was formerly thought to be a unique autosomal dominant disorder due to a P63 gene mutation. However, it was recently shown to the same disease as Hay–Wells syndrome.

It was first characterized in 1968.

== See also ==
- Punctate porokeratosis
- List of cutaneous conditions
