= LETM1 =

Protein-coding gene in the species Homo sapiens

Identifiers
- Aliases: LETM1, leucine zipper and EF-hand containing transmembrane protein 1, SLC55A1
- External IDs: OMIM: 604407; MGI: 1932557; GeneCards: LETM1

Gene location (Human)
Chr.	Chromosome 4 (human)
Band	4p16.3	Start	1,811,479 bp
Band	4p16.3	End	1,856,156 bp

Gene location (Mouse)
Chr.	Chromosome 5 (mouse)
Band	5|5 B2	Start	33,897,017 bp
Band	5|5 B2	End	33,940,161 bp
RNA expression pattern
Bgee	Human / Mouse (ortholog); Top expressed in: mucosa of transverse colon; sural nerve; buccal mucosa cell; apex of heart; epithelium of nasopharynx; stromal cell of endometrium; right adrenal gland; right adrenal cortex; right lobe of thyroid gland; left adrenal cortex / Top expressed in: right kidney; brown adipose tissue; proximal tubule; dentate gyrus of hippocampal formation granule cell; jejunum; myocardium of ventricle; human kidney; intestinal villus; muscle of thigh; duodenum; More reference expression data
BioGPS	n/a
Gene ontology
Molecular function	ribosome binding; calcium ion binding; protein binding; metal ion binding; calcium:proton antiporter activity; antiporter activity
Cellular component	integral component of membrane; mitochondrial inner membrane; membrane; mitochondrion
Biological process	cristae formation; cellular metal ion homeostasis; mitochondrial calcium ion transmembrane transport; protein hexamerization; protein homooligomerization; mitochondrial calcium ion homeostasis; calcium export from the mitochondrion; ion transport; calcium ion transport; negative regulation of mitochondrial calcium ion concentration; regulation of cellular hyperosmotic salinity response
Sources:Amigo / QuickGO
Orthologs
Databases	NCBI: entry; OMA: entry
Species	Human	Mouse
Entrez	3954	56384
Ensembl	ENSG00000168924	ENSMUSG00000005299
UniProt	O95202	Q9Z2I0
RefSeq (mRNA)	NM_012318	NM_019694
RefSeq (protein)	NP_036450	NP_062668
Location (UCSC)	Chr 4: 1.81 – 1.86 Mb	Chr 5: 33.9 – 33.94 Mb
PubMed search
- Wikidata
View/Edit Human	View/Edit Mouse

Leucine zipper-EF-hand containing transmembrane protein 1 is a protein that in humans is encoded by the LETM1 gene.

== Structure ==
The LETM1 protein has a transmembrane domain and a casein kinase 2 and protein kinase C phosphorylation site. The LETM1 gene is expressed in the mitochondria of many eukaryotes indicating that this is a conserved mitochondrial protein.

== Function ==
LETM1 is a eukaryotic protein that is expressed in the inner membrane of mitochondria. Experiments performed with human cells have been interpreted to indicate that it functions as a component of a Ca^{2+}/H^{+} antiporter. Experimental results with yeast cells have been interpreted as suggesting that LETM1 functions as a component of a K^{+}/H^{+} antiporter. The Drosophila melanogaster LETM1 protein has been shown to functionally substitute for the K^{+}/H^{+} antiporter function in yeast cells.

== Clinical significance ==
Deletion of LETM1 is thought to be involved in the development of Wolf–Hirschhorn syndrome in humans.

== See also ==
- LETM1-like protein family
