= DNAJA1 =

Protein-coding gene in the species Homo sapiens

Identifiers
- Aliases: DNAJA1, DJ-2, DjA1, HDJ2, HSDJ, HSJ2, HSPF4, NEDD7, hDJ-2, HSJ-2, DnaJ heat shock protein family (Hsp40) member A1
- External IDs: OMIM: 602837; MGI: 1270129; GeneCards: DNAJA1
Available structures
PDB	Ortholog search: PDBe RCSB
PDB	List of PDB id codes 2LO1, 2M6Y

Gene location (Human)
Chr.	Chromosome 9 (human)
Band	9p21.1	Start	33,025,273 bp
Band	9p21.1	End	33,039,907 bp

Gene location (Mouse)
Chr.	Chromosome 4 (mouse)
Band	4|4 A5	Start	40,722,150 bp
Band	4|4 A5	End	40,737,149 bp
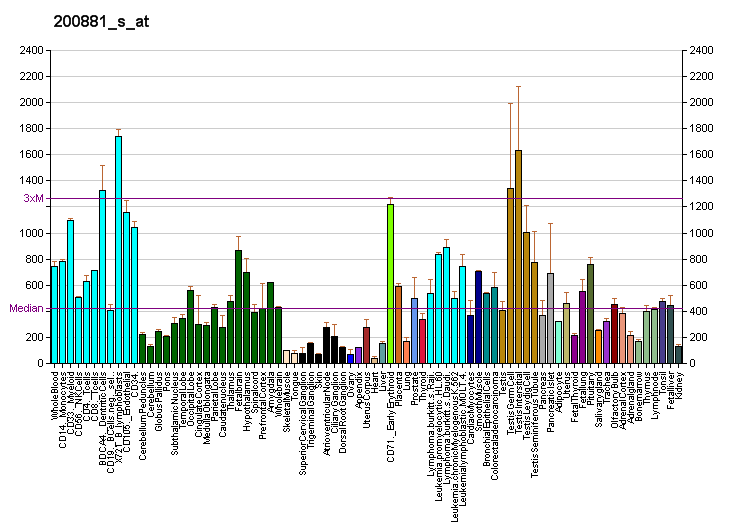

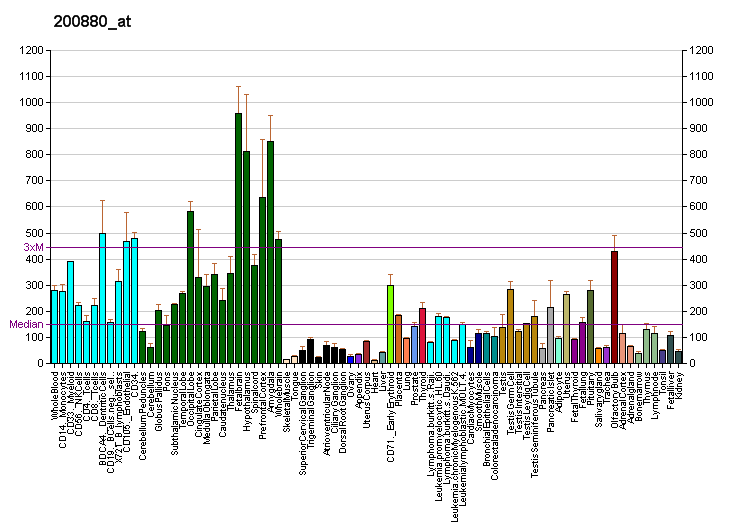
RNA expression pattern
Bgee	Human / Mouse (ortholog); Top expressed in: oocyte; bronchial epithelial cell; ganglionic eminence; amniotic fluid; mucosa of paranasal sinus; secondary oocyte; mucosa of sigmoid colon; ventricular zone; beta cell; stromal cell of endometrium / Top expressed in: genital tubercle; tail of embryo; morula; morula; facial motor nucleus; right kidney; ganglionic eminence; blastocyst; dentate gyrus of hippocampal formation granule cell; anterior horn of spinal cord; More reference expression data
BioGPS	More reference expression data
Gene ontology
Molecular function	chaperone binding; heat shock protein binding; unfolded protein binding; C3HC4-type RING finger domain binding; metal ion binding; low-density lipoprotein particle receptor binding; Hsp70 protein binding; protein binding; G protein-coupled receptor binding; ATP binding; ubiquitin protein ligase binding; Tat protein binding; ATPase activator activity
Cellular component	cytoplasm; membrane; intracellular membrane-bounded organelle; ubiquitin ligase complex; mitochondrion; cytoplasmic side of endoplasmic reticulum membrane; endoplasmic reticulum; perinuclear region of cytoplasm; extracellular exosome; nucleus; microtubule cytoskeleton; cytosol
Biological process	flagellated sperm motility; androgen receptor signaling pathway; regulation of protein transport; negative regulation of apoptotic process; response to heat; toxin transport; negative regulation of protein ubiquitination; response to unfolded protein; protein folding; spermatogenesis; positive regulation of apoptotic process; protein localization to mitochondrion; negative regulation of JUN kinase activity; negative regulation of establishment of protein localization to mitochondrion; negative regulation of nitrosative stress-induced intrinsic apoptotic signaling pathway; positive regulation of ATP-dependent activity
Sources:Amigo / QuickGO
Orthologs
Databases	NCBI: entry; OMA: entry
Species	Human	Mouse
Entrez	3301	15502
Ensembl	ENSG00000086061	ENSMUSG00000028410
UniProt	P31689	P63037
RefSeq (mRNA)	NM_001539; NM_001314039	NM_001164671; NM_001164672; NM_008298
RefSeq (protein)	NP_001300968; NP_001530	NP_001158143; NP_001158144; NP_032324
Location (UCSC)	Chr 9: 33.03 – 33.04 Mb	Chr 4: 40.72 – 40.74 Mb
PubMed search
- Wikidata
View/Edit Human	View/Edit Mouse

DnaJ homolog subfamily A member 1 is a protein that in humans is encoded by the DNAJA1 gene.

== Interactions ==
DNAJA1 has been shown to interact with PTTG1.
