= Ankyloblepharon =

- Specialty: Ophthalmology
- Complications: Amblyopia (in congenital ankyloblepharon)
- Usual onset: Congenital or acquired
- Types: Complete, partial, and interrupted (ankyloblepharon filiforme adnatum)
- Differential diagnosis: Symblepharon
- Treatment: Surgery

Ankyloblepharon is a medical condition, defined as the adhesion of the edges of the upper eyelid with the lower eyelid. Ankyloblepharon must be differentiated from blepharophimosis, in which palpebral aperture is reduced and there is telecanthus, but the eyelid margins are normal. Another condition similar to ankyloblepharon is symblepharon, in which the palpebral conjunctiva is attached to the bulbar conjunctiva. Recognition of ankyloblepharon necessitates systemic examination to detect associated abnormalities such as genitourinary and cardiac abnormalities and syndactyly.

== Presentation ==
=== Complication ===
The main complication of congenital ankyloblepharon is amblyopia. Timely separation of the eyelids is very important to avoid the development of occlusion amblyopia.

== Etiology ==
Ankyloblepharon may be congenital or acquired. The most common type is congenital.

Clinically, ankyloblepharon may be complete, partial, or interrupted. Complete ankyloblepharon is when the eyelids are fused throughout the lid margins. In the partial form, they are joined at one or more points. The interrupted form is also known as ankyloblepharon filiforme adnatum (AFA).

=== Congenital ankyloblepharon ===
During fetal development, eyelid margins remain fused until the fifth gestational month, and may not be completely separated until the seventh month of gestation. Congenital ankyloblepharon occurs when the lid margins fail to separate at birth. The exact etiology of this condition is unknown. The currently accepted theory is that this condition is due to temporary epithelial arrest and rapid mesenchymal proliferation, allowing union of eyelids at abnormal positions.

==== Systemic associations ====
Congenital ankyloblepharon is seen in association with:

- Hay–Wells syndrome: Ankyloblepharon-Ectodermal dysplasia-Clefting (AEC) syndrome also known as Hay-Wells syndrome is a rare autosomal dominant disorder characterized by ankyloblepharon, ectodermal dysplasia, and cleft palate and/or cleft lip.
- Curly hair–ankyloblepharon–nail disease (CHAND) syndrome: it is a clinical variant of AEC syndrome. It is also known as Baughman syndrome.
- Trisomy 18 (Edwards syndrome): AFA may be seen in association with trisomy 18.
- Popliteal pterygium syndrome (PPS): Popliteal pterygium syndrome (PPS) is a rare autosomal dominant disorder, first described by Trelat in 1869. The clinical features of the syndrome are highly variable and show different combinations of anomalies like cleft palate, cleft lip, lower lip pits or sinuses, popliteal webbing, syndactyly, genitourinary anomalies, nail anomalies, syngnathia, ankyloblepharon, talipes, and digital reduction defects.

=== Acquired ankyloblepharon ===
Acquired ankyloblepharon may occur due to trauma or inflammatory conditions. It may be associated with symblepharon also. The following conditions cause ankyloblepharon:

- Chemical burns, thermal burns, or trauma to the eyes
- Cicatrising diseases such as Stevens–Johnson syndrome or cicatricial ocular pemphigoid
- Inflammatory diseases such as herpes simplex infection or ulcerative blepharitis
- Trachoma
- Cicatricial conjunctivitis
- Mucous membrane pemphigoid: ocular form of mucous membrane pemphigoid may cause ankyloblepharon (4th stage of foster grading system).

== Treatment ==
Lids should be separated by excision of adhesions between the lid margins and kept apart during the healing process. When adhesions extend to the angles, epithelial grafts should be given to prevent recurrences.

== History ==
Ankyloblepharon was first described by von Anmmon in 1841. Ankyloblepharon filiforme adnatum (AFA), the interrupted form of Ankyloblepharon, was first described by Von Hasner in 1881.

== Etymology ==
The word ankyloblepharon is derived from Greek ankylos (ἀγκύλος) 'bent, crooked, closed' and blepharon (βλέφαρον) 'eyelid'.

== See also ==
- Symblepharon
- Blepharophimosis
