= LETMD1 =

Protein-coding gene in the species Homo sapiens

Identifiers
- Aliases: LETMD1, 1110019O13Rik, HCCR-1, HCCR-2, HCCR1, HCRR-2, LETM1 domain containing 1
- External IDs: MGI: 1915864; GeneCards: LETMD1

Gene location (Mouse)
Chr.	Chromosome 15 (mouse)
Band	15|15 F1	Start	100,366,904 bp
Band	15|15 F1	End	100,377,045 bp
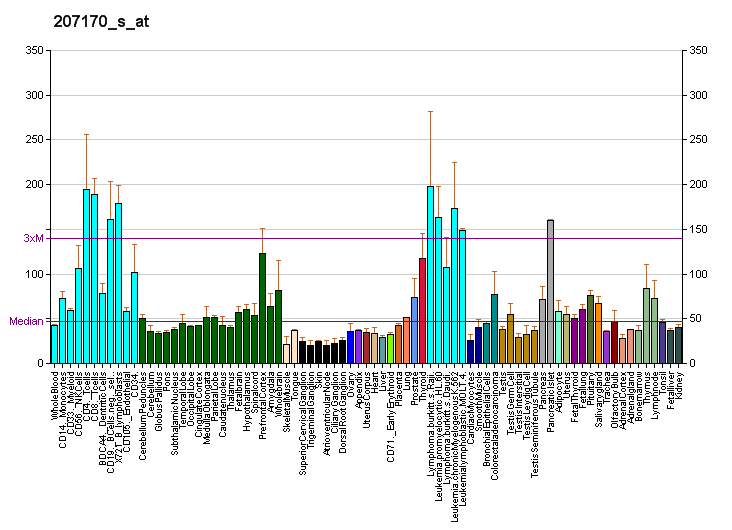
RNA expression pattern
Bgee	Human / Mouse (ortholog); n/a / Top expressed in: brown adipose tissue; ascending aorta; dentate gyrus of hippocampal formation granule cell; cumulus cell; lumbar spinal ganglion; adrenal gland; Rostral migratory stream; superior frontal gyrus; aortic valve; primary visual cortex
BioGPS	More reference expression data
Gene ontology
Molecular function	protein binding; ribosome binding
Cellular component	mitochondrial outer membrane; membrane; integral component of membrane; nucleoplasm; mitochondrion; mitochondrial inner membrane
Biological process	cellular metal ion homeostasis
Sources:Amigo / QuickGO
Orthologs
Databases	NCBI: entry; OMA: entry
Species	Human	Mouse
Entrez	25875	68614
Ensembl	ENSG00000050426	ENSMUSG00000037353
UniProt	Q6P1Q0	Q924L1
RefSeq (mRNA)	NM_001024668; NM_001024669; NM_001024670; NM_001024671; NM_001243689 NM_001300765; NM_015416	NM_134093; NM_001357982; NM_001357983; NM_001357984
RefSeq (protein)	NP_001230618; NP_001287694; NP_056231; NP_001338242; NP_001338245 NP_001338246; NP_001338248; NP_001338249; NP_001338250; NP_001338251; NP_001338252; NP_001338253; NP_001338254; NP_001338255; NP_001338256; NP_001338257; NP_001338259; NP_001338261; NP_001338262; NP_001338263; NP_001338264; NP_001338265; NP_001338266; NP_001338241; NP_001338244	NP_598854; NP_001344911; NP_001344912; NP_001344913
Location (UCSC)	n/a	Chr 15: 100.37 – 100.38 Mb
PubMed search
- Wikidata
View/Edit Human	View/Edit Mouse

LETM1 domain-containing protein 1 is a protein that in humans is encoded by the LETMD1 gene.
