= DCHS2 =

Protein-coding gene in the species Homo sapiens

Identifiers
- Aliases: DCHS2, CDH27, CDHJ, CDHR7, PCDH23, PCDHJ, dachsous cadherin-related 2
- External IDs: OMIM: 612486; GeneCards: DCHS2

Gene location (Human)
Chr.	Chromosome 4 (human)
Band	4q31.3	Start	154,231,742 bp
Band	4q31.3	End	154,491,799 bp
RNA expression pattern
Bgee	Human / Mouse (ortholog); Top expressed in: prefrontal cortex; Achilles tendon; superior frontal gyrus; nucleus accumbens; smooth muscle tissue; muscle layer of sigmoid colon; sural nerve; body of uterus; myometrium; caudate nucleus / n/a; More reference expression data
BioGPS	n/a
Gene ontology
Molecular function	calcium ion binding; molecular function; cadherin binding
Cellular component	integral component of membrane; plasma membrane; membrane; cellular component
Biological process	cell adhesion; homophilic cell adhesion via plasma membrane adhesion molecules; biological process; cell-cell adhesion
Sources:Amigo / QuickGO
Orthologs
Databases	NCBI: entry; OMA: entry
Species	Human	Mouse
Entrez	54798	n/a
Ensembl	ENSG00000197410; ENSG00000284227	n/a
UniProt	Q6V1P9	n/a
RefSeq (mRNA)	NM_001142552; NM_001142553; NM_017639; NM_199348; NM_001358235	n/a
RefSeq (protein)	NP_001136024; NP_001345164	n/a
Location (UCSC)	Chr 4: 154.23 – 154.49 Mb	n/a
PubMed search		n/a
- Wikidata
View/Edit Human

Protein dachsous homolog 2, also known as protocadherin-23 (PCDH23) or cadherin-27 (CDH27), is a protein that in humans is encoded by the DCHS2 gene.

DCHS2 has been implicated in the nose angle (how much a nose is upturned). As well as facial genetics
