= DDX24 =

Protein-coding gene in the species Homo sapiens

Identifiers
- Aliases: DDX24, DEAD-box helicase 24
- External IDs: OMIM: 606181; MGI: 1351337; GeneCards: DDX24
Enzyme activity
EC #	BRENDA	ExPASy	KEGG	MetaCyc
3.6.4.13	↗	↗	↗	↗

Gene location (Human)
Chr.	Chromosome 14 (human)
Band	14q32.12	Start	94,048,287 bp
Band	14q32.12	End	94,081,202 bp

Gene location (Mouse)
Chr.	Chromosome 12 (mouse)
Band	12|12 E	Start	103,374,241 bp
Band	12|12 E	End	103,392,089 bp
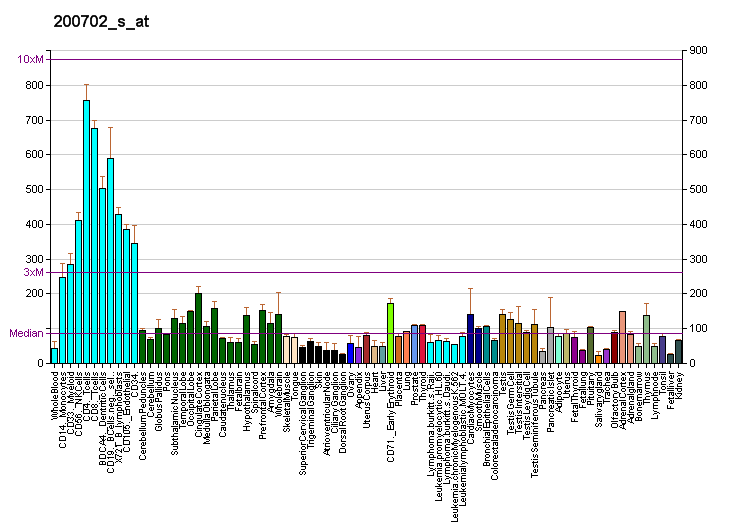

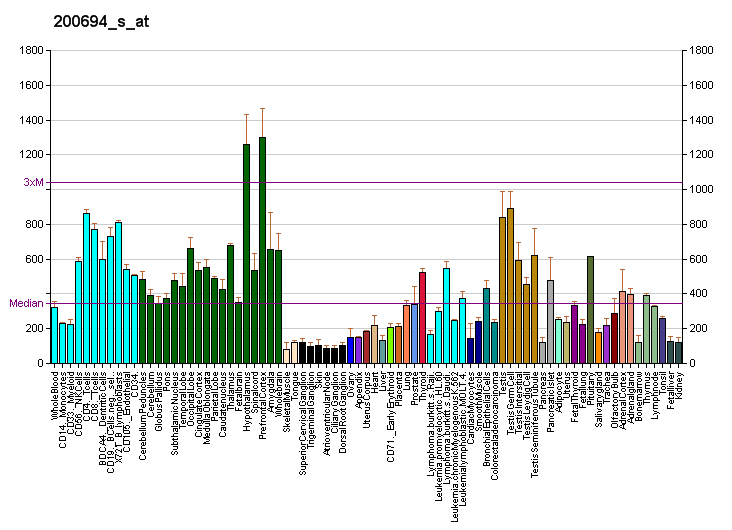
RNA expression pattern
Bgee	Human / Mouse (ortholog); Top expressed in: right testis; superior frontal gyrus; left testis; anterior pituitary; primary visual cortex; prefrontal cortex; Brodmann area 9; hypothalamus; right frontal lobe; left adrenal gland / Top expressed in: spermatocyte; spermatid; dentate gyrus of hippocampal formation granule cell; primary visual cortex; superior frontal gyrus; neural layer of retina; muscle of thigh; embryo; yolk sac; tail of embryo; More reference expression data
BioGPS	More reference expression data
Gene ontology
Molecular function	RNA helicase activity; nucleotide binding; hydrolase activity; ATP binding; helicase activity; nucleic acid binding; RNA binding
Cellular component	membrane; nucleolus; cytoplasm
Biological process	RNA metabolic process; RNA secondary structure unwinding
Sources:Amigo / QuickGO
Orthologs
Databases	NCBI: entry; OMA: entry
Species	Human	Mouse
Entrez	57062	27225
Ensembl	ENSG00000089737	ENSMUSG00000041645
UniProt	Q9GZR7	Q9ESV0
RefSeq (mRNA)	NM_020414	NM_001159502; NM_020494; NM_001364162; NM_001364163
RefSeq (protein)	NP_065147	NP_001152974; NP_065240; NP_001351091; NP_001351092
Location (UCSC)	Chr 14: 94.05 – 94.08 Mb	Chr 12: 103.37 – 103.39 Mb
PubMed search
- Wikidata
View/Edit Human	View/Edit Mouse

ATP-dependent RNA helicase DDX24 is an enzyme that in humans is encoded by the DDX24 gene.

DEAD box proteins, characterized by the conserved motif Asp-Glu-Ala-Asp (DEAD), are putative RNA helicases. They are implicated in a number of cellular processes involving alteration of RNA secondary structure such as translation initiation, nuclear and mitochondrial RNA splicing, and ribosome and spliceosome assembly. Based on their distribution patterns, some members of this family are believed to be involved in embryogenesis, spermatogenesis, and cellular growth and division. This gene encodes a DEAD box protein, which shows little similarity to any of the other known human DEAD box proteins, but shows a high similarity to mouse Ddx24 at the amino acid level.
