= Cadherin cytoplasmic region =

Cadherin_C
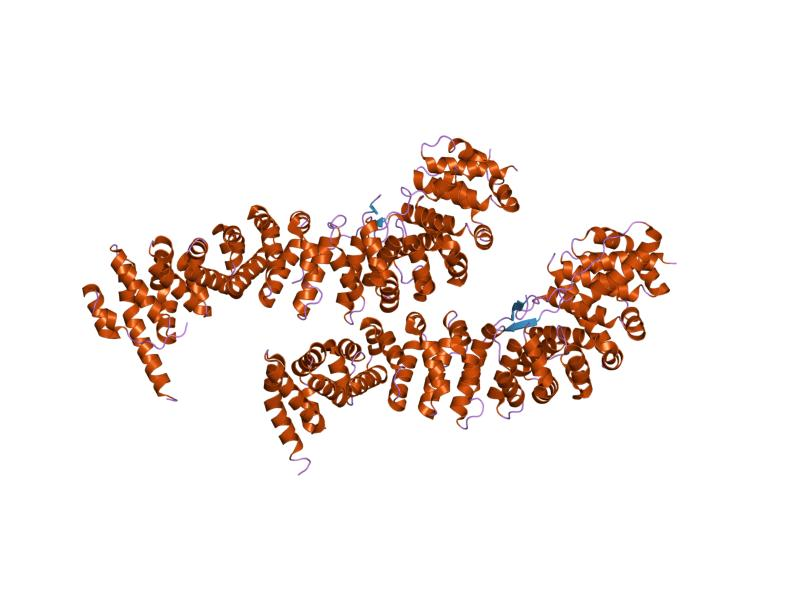
- beta-catenin/e-cadherin complex

Identifiers
- Symbol: Cadherin_C
- Pfam: PF01049
- InterPro: IPR000233
- SCOP2: 1i7w / SCOPe / SUPFAM
Available protein structures:
- PDB: IPR000233 PF01049 (ECOD; PDBsum)
- AlphaFold: IPR000233; PF01049

In molecular biology, the cadherin cytoplasmic region is a conserved region found at the C-terminus of cadherin proteins. A key determinant to the strength of the binding that it is mediated by cadherins is the juxtamembrane region (the part of the cytoplasmic region which is adjacent to the transmembrane domain) of the cadherin. This region induces clustering and also binds to the protein catenin (p120ctn). The cytoplasmic region is highly conserved in sequence and has been shown experimentally to regulate the cell-cell binding function of the extracellular domain of E-cadherin, possibly through interaction with the cytoskeleton.

== See also ==
- Protocadherin, a different, unrelated cytoplasmic region
