= Emily Willingham =

American scientist and journalist (born 1968)

Emily Jane Willingham
- Born: 1968 (age 57–58); Waco, Texas, U.S.
- Education: University of Texas at Austin
- Known for: Scientific skepticism, work on endocrine disruptors
- Children: 3
- Awards: UT-Austin department of biological sciences professional development award, 1998
- Scientific career
- Fields: Endocrinology, urology
- Workplaces: UCSF, Texas State University, St. Edward's University
- Thesis: Embryonic exposure to low-dose pesticides : dose response and effects on growth in the hatching red-eared slider turtle (2001)

Emily Jane Willingham (born 1968) is an American journalist and scientist. Her writing focuses on neuroscience, genetics, psychology, health and medicine, and occasionally on evolution and ecology.

She is the joint recipient with David Robert Grimes of the 2014 John Maddox Prize, awarded by science charity Sense about Science, for standing up for science in the face of personal attacks.

== Education ==
Willingham received her bachelor's degree in English in 1989 and her PhD in biology in 2001, both from the University of Texas at Austin. She completed a fellowship in pediatric urology at the University of California, San Francisco, from 2004 to 2006, where she studied under Laurence S. Baskin.

== Writing ==
Willingham's work has been published online at Scientific American, Aeon, San Francisco Chronicle, Washington Post, Slate, Undark, Knowable, The Scientist, and others and has appeared in print in several local, regional, and national outlets, including in single-issue publications for Centennial Media.

Willingham was a contributor to the Forbes network for several years and ran an informal blog, "A Life Less Ordinary", which she started in 2007 and which published its last post on November 25, 2011. At Forbes.com, Willingham focused on what she described as "the science they're selling you," which included the disproven link between vaccines and autism, as well as the Seralini affair. She has also written multiple articles for Slate.com about GMOs, childbirth, astronaut DNA, and autism, including about what the motivation might have been for Adam Lanza to carry out the Sandy Hook elementary school shooting. Her view is that his alleged Asperger's syndrome was not a contributing factor, but that untreated schizophrenia was a more likely cause of his actions. In addition, she has contributed to Discover, where she has argued that the autism epidemic may, in fact, just be the result of diagnostic substitution and increased awareness of the condition. She was called "one of the sharpest science writers in the blogosphere" by Steve Silberman.

In 2016, Willingham, along with co-author Tara Haelle, published The Informed Parent: A Science-Based Resource for Your Child's First Four Years, which examines the science around several parenting-related controversies and common parenting concerns.

In 2020, Emily Willingham published her next book titled Phallacy. The book is a deep dive into penises in the animal kingdom within which she creates a new word for penis, intromittum, a more general description for all organs that relay sex cells between sexual mates of all species.

In 2021, she published another book, The Tailored Brain, that speaks on and debunks myths about diets, supplements, and brain training techniques said to improve brain function.

== Research ==
Willingham has published 44 scientific papers, and, according to Google Scholar, her h-index is 22. With regard to her research, Willingham has said that talking about it "has always carried a frisson of the risque." Her research has also led her to what she describes as cool things, including ultrasound and surgery on a spotted hyena and plastic casting of the inside of the mammalian penis. Willingham's PhD research involved sex determination and the effects of pesticides and other environmental compounds on sex determination and development in the red-eared slider. She also has published on the effects of endocrine-disrupting chemicals such as atrazine.

== Personal life ==
Willingham stated in 2012 that she identified as having Asperger syndrome, which her son has been diagnosed with, but did not intend to pursue a formal diagnosis.

== Selected publications ==
=== Scientific papers ===
- Sheehan, D. M.; Willingham, E.; Gaylor, D.; Bergeron, J. M.; Crews, D. (1999). "No threshold dose for estradiol-induced sex reversal of turtle embryos: How little is too much?". Environmental Health Perspectives. 107 (2): 155–159. Bibcode:1999EnvHP.107..155S. doi:10.1289/ehp.99107155. PMC 1566346. PMID 9924012.
- Willingham, E.; Baldwin, R.; Skipper, J. K.; Crews, D. (2000). "Aromatase Activity during Embryogenesis in the Brain and Adrenal–Kidney–Gonad of the Red-Eared Slider Turtle, a Species with Temperature-Dependent Sex Determination". General and Comparative Endocrinology. 119 (2): 202–207. doi:10.1006/gcen.2000.7505. PMID 10936040.
- Wang, Z.; Liu, B. C.; Lin, G. T.; Lin, C. S.; Lue, T. F.; Willingham, E.; Baskin, L. S. (2007). "Up-Regulation of Estrogen Responsive Genes in Hypospadias: Microarray Analysis". The Journal of Urology. 177 (5): 1939–1946. doi:10.1016/j.juro.2007.01.014. PMID 17437852.

=== Books ===
- Willingham, Emily (2010). The Complete Idiot's Guide to College Biology. Alpha Books.
- Willingham, Emily; Myers, Jennifer Byde; Rosa, Shannon Des Roches; Greenburg, Carol (2011). Thinking Person's Guide To Autism: Everything You Need to Know from Autistics, Parents, and Professionals. Deadwood City Publishing. ISBN 978-0692010556.
- Willingham, Emily (2011). When Worlds Collide: The Troubled History of Bears and People in Texas. Amazon Digital Services. ASIN B005OMWX36.
- Tara Haelle; Emily Willingham (2016). The Informed Parent: A Science-Based Resource for Your Child's First Four Years. New York, NY: TarcherPerigee. ISBN 9780399171062.
- Willingham, Emily (2020). Phallacy: Life Lessons from the Animal Penis. Avery Publishing. ISBN 9780593087176.
- Willingham, Emily (2021). The Tailored Brain: From Ketamine, to Keto, to Companionship, A User's Guide to Feeling Better and Thinking Smarter. Basic Books. ISBN 9781541647022.
