= Éric Fombonne =

French psychiatrist and epidemiologist

- Born: Paris
- Education: University of Paris V
- Known for: Epidemiology of autism
- Spouse: Rebecca Fuhrer
- Children: 3
- Scientific career
- Fields: Child psychiatry
- Workplaces: McGill University
- Thesis: [www.worldcat.org/oclc/464917366 À propos d'un essai thérapeutique multicentrique en psychiatrie : comparaison des critères d'évaluation et analyse de l'effet-centre] (1980)

Éric Fombonne is a French psychiatrist and epidemiologist based in Montreal.

== Career ==
Fombonne trained in Paris and was subsequently appointed as a career research scientist in Paris, at the Institut National de la Santé et de la Recherche Médicale (INSERM). In the early 1990s, he joined Pr. Rutter's MRC Child Psychiatry Unit at the Institute of Psychiatry at King's College London where he held a Senior Lecturer post and an Honorary Consultant position at the Maudsley Hospital.

In 1997, he was promoted as Reader In Epidemiological Psychiatry at the Institute of psychiatry. In 2001, he was appointed at McGill University in Canada as tenured full professor in Psychiatry. From 2001 to 2009, he directed the child psychiatry division at McGill University and the psychiatry department at the Montreal Children's Hospital, where he played a key role in the launch of its autism clinical and research program.

Fombonne is also the recipient of the Canada Research Chair in child psychiatry since 2001. He is a practicing child psychiatrist and has clinics at the Montreal Children's Hospital for subjects with autism and other developmental disorders. Fombonne was president of the Association of Professors of Child and Adolescent Psychiatry of Canada (APCAPC).

He was Associate Editor of the Journal of Autism and Developmental Disorders from 1994 to 2003, and is a member of several editorial boards, and a consultant for several scientific organizations such as NIH/NIMH or foundations. Over the years, he has been a supportive member of several family associations, including Autism France and Autism Europe.

== Research ==
His research focuses on epidemiological investigations of childhood mental illness and related risk factors, with a particular focus on the epidemiology of autism. He conducted the first population based survey of child psychiatric disorders among school aged children in France. In the UK, he conducted research on childhood depression and its long term outcomes. In France and in the UK, and later in Canada, he performed several surveys of autism in childhood populations. He and his colleagues were credited with demonstrating that there is no epidemiological evidence of a link between the MMR vaccine or mercury-containing vaccines and autism, as postulated by other researchers including Andrew Wakefield. Fombonne was subsequently involved as a key scientific expert witness in several trials in US courts and class actions. He was influential in explicating the lack of evidence linking thimerosal in vaccines, or specific vaccine types such as MMR, to autism in children. He testified on behalf of the US DHSS and the US Department of Justice in well publicized trials in front of the Vaccine Injury Compensation Court in Washington DC between 2006 and 2008.

He has conducted several epidemiological studies of child and adolescent psychopathology, looking at overall mental health, depression, eating and substance use disorders. An early focus of his work was on secular trends in the incidence of youth mental health disorders, and factors that might cause these changes over time. One of the major studies conducted by Fombonne examined depression and suicidal behaviors, which linked alcohol abuse to increased suicidal tendencies in boys, using data on 6,000 subjects. He has also been involved in long-term outcome studies of child and adolescent depression.

At McGill University, Fombonne has consolidated the autism spectrum disorder program at the Montreal Children's Hospital since his appointment there in 2001. He currently heads an autism research program directed at evaluating environmental risk factors, such as vaccines and environmental neurotoxicants, and investigating genetic risks associated with the heritability of autism. He has also been involved in several molecular genetic studies of autism, and in outcome studies of autism spectrum disorders.

Does this mean there is an epidemic of PDD? Not at all. We believe the high rates we are seeing are the result of a combination of factors. With improved recognition of the symptoms, diagnosis of PDD is now being made more frequently and at an earlier age, thus increasing the number of children being diagnosed. More rigorous methods used in recent surveys have also improved our ability to find cases of PDD. The lower rates found in two of the most recent studies, for instance, most certainly reflect less sensitive case finding approaches.

— Eric Fombonne

Fombonne recently conducted a metanalysis of available epidemiological evidence of the prevalence of autism. His review concluded that the prevalence rate for autism is 25/10,000 and the rate of all pervasive developmental disorders around 90/10,000. However, he also noted several more recent studies indicating a much higher prevalence rate than this with a broader inclusion basis. He attributes the apparent rise in autism cases to wider recognition of the condition, and argues that claims of an 'autism epidemic' are unfounded unless proven otherwise. In 2001, he told the BBC "That rates in recent surveys are substantially higher than 30 years ago merely reflects the adoption of a much broader concept of autism, a recognition of autism among normally intelligent subjects and an improved identification of persons with autism." However, he also states that a real change in the incidence of autism in human populations may also have contributed to the upward trends and that environmental risk factors that may influence these changes should be examined.

== Publications ==
Fombonne has written over 260 scientific reports in peer reviewed journals and 40 book chapters. He was associate editor of the Journal of Autism and Developmental Disorders from 1994 to 2003.

=== Selected works ===
- Fombonne E. (1994) The Chartres study. I. Prevalence of psychiatric disorders among French school-aged children. British Journal of Psychiatry, 164, 69–79.
- Fombonne E, Wostear G, Cooper V, Harrington R, Rutter M. (2001). The Maudsley long-term follow-up study of adolescent depression. I. Adult rates of psychiatric disorders. British Journal of Psychiatry, 179: 210–217.
- Fombonne E, Wostear G, Cooper V, Harrington R, Rutter M. (2001). The Maudsley long-term follow-up study of adolescent depression. II. Suicidality, criminality and social dysfunction in adulthood. British Journal of Psychiatry, 179: 218–223.
- Fombonne E, du Mazaubrun C, Cans H, Grandjean H. (1997). Autism and associated medical disorders in a large French epidemiological sample. Journal of the American Academy of Child and Adolescent Psychiatry, 36: 1561-1569
- Lazoff T, Zhong LH, Piperni T, Fombonne E. (2010) Prevalence of Pervasive Developmental Disorders among children at the English Montreal School Board. Canadian Journal of Psychiatry, 55, 11: 715–20.
- Fombonne E, Chakrabarti S. (2001). No evidence for a new variant of Measles-Mumps-Rubella-induced autism. Pediatrics, 108 (4) e58.
- Chakrabarti S, Fombonne E, (2001). Pervasive developmental disorders in preschool children. Journal of the American Medical Association (JAMA), 285: 3093–3099.
- Smeeth L, Cook C, Fombonne E, Heavey L, Rodrigues LC, Smith PG, Hall AJ. (2004) MMR vaccination and pervasive developmental disorders: a case-control study. Lancet, 364, 963–969.
- Fombonne E, Zakarian R, Bennett A, Meng L, McLean-Heywood D. (2006) Pervasive developmental disorders in Montréal, Québec: prevalence and links with immunizations. Pediatrics, 118:139-150.
- D’Souza Y, Fombonne E, Ward B. (2006) No evidence of persisting measles virus in peripheral blood mononuclear cells from children with autism spectrum disorder. Pediatrics, 118, 1664 – 1675.
- Fombonne E, (1994). Increased rates of depression: update of epidemiological findings and analytical problems. Acta Psychiatrica Scandinavica, 90: 145–156.
- Fombonne E, Anorexia nervosa: no evidence of an increase (1995). British Journal of Psychiatry,166, 462–471.
- Fombonne E. Suicidal behaviours in vulnerable adolescents: time trends and their correlates (1998). British Journal of Psychiatry, 173, 154–159.
- Fombonne E., Quirke S., Hagen A. (2011): Epidemiology of pervasive developmental disorders. In: Autism Spectrum Disorders. Amaral DG, Dawson G, and Geschwind DH (Eds). Oxford University Press. pp. 90–111.

== Personal life ==
As of 2001 Fombonne was married to Rebecca Fuhrer. They have three children.
