= CDH16 =

Protein-coding gene in humans

Identifiers
- Aliases: CDH16, cadherin 16
- External IDs: OMIM: 603118; MGI: 106671; GeneCards: CDH16

Gene location (Human)
Chr.	Chromosome 16 (human)
Band	16q22.1	Start	66,908,122 bp
Band	16q22.1	End	66,918,917 bp

Gene location (Mouse)
Chr.	Chromosome 8 (mouse)
Band	8 D3|8 53.04 cM	Start	105,328,543 bp
Band	8 D3|8 53.04 cM	End	105,351,028 bp
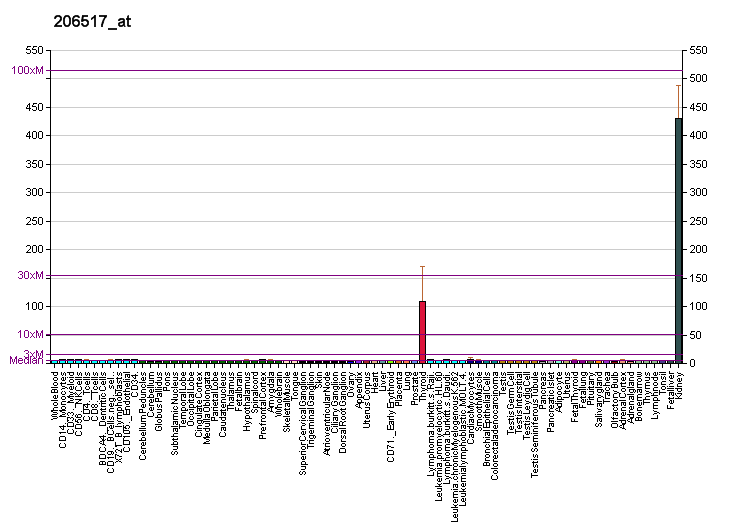
RNA expression pattern
Bgee	Human / Mouse (ortholog); Top expressed in: renal medulla; kidney tubule; left lobe of thyroid gland; right lobe of thyroid gland; glomerulus; metanephric glomerulus; human kidney; muscle of thigh; caput epididymis; gonad / Top expressed in: human kidney; right kidney; medullary collecting duct; proximal tubule; efferent ductule; vas deferens; renal corpuscle; left lung lobe; renal pelvis; trachea; More reference expression data
BioGPS	More reference expression data
Gene ontology
Molecular function	calcium ion binding; metal ion binding
Cellular component	integral component of membrane; plasma membrane; extracellular exosome; membrane; integral component of plasma membrane; basolateral plasma membrane
Biological process	calcium-dependent cell-cell adhesion via plasma membrane cell adhesion molecules; cell adhesion; homophilic cell adhesion via plasma membrane adhesion molecules; cell-cell signaling; nervous system development
Sources:Amigo / QuickGO
Orthologs
Databases	NCBI: entry; OMA: entry
Species	Human	Mouse
Entrez	1014	12556
Ensembl	ENSG00000166589	ENSMUSG00000031881
UniProt	O75309	O88338
RefSeq (mRNA)	NM_001204744; NM_001204745; NM_001204746; NM_004062	NM_001252627; NM_001252628; NM_007663
RefSeq (protein)	NP_001191673; NP_001191674; NP_001191675; NP_004053	NP_001239556; NP_001239557; NP_031689
Location (UCSC)	Chr 16: 66.91 – 66.92 Mb	Chr 8: 105.33 – 105.35 Mb
PubMed search
- Wikidata
View/Edit Human	View/Edit Mouse

Cadherin-16 is a protein that in humans is encoded by the CDH16 gene.

This gene is a member of the cadherin superfamily, genes encoding calcium-dependent, membrane-associated glycoproteins. Mapped to a previously identified cluster of cadherin genes on chromosome 16q22.1, the gene localizes with superfamily members CDH1, CDH3, CDH5, CDH8 and CDH11. The protein consists of an extracellular domain containing 6 cadherin domains, a transmembrane region and a truncated cytoplasmic domain but lacks the prosequence and tripeptide HAV adhesion recognition sequence typical of most classical cadherins. Expression is exclusively in the kidney, where the protein functions as the principal mediator of homotypic cellular recognition, playing a role in the morphogenic direction of tissue development.
