= Heritability of autism =

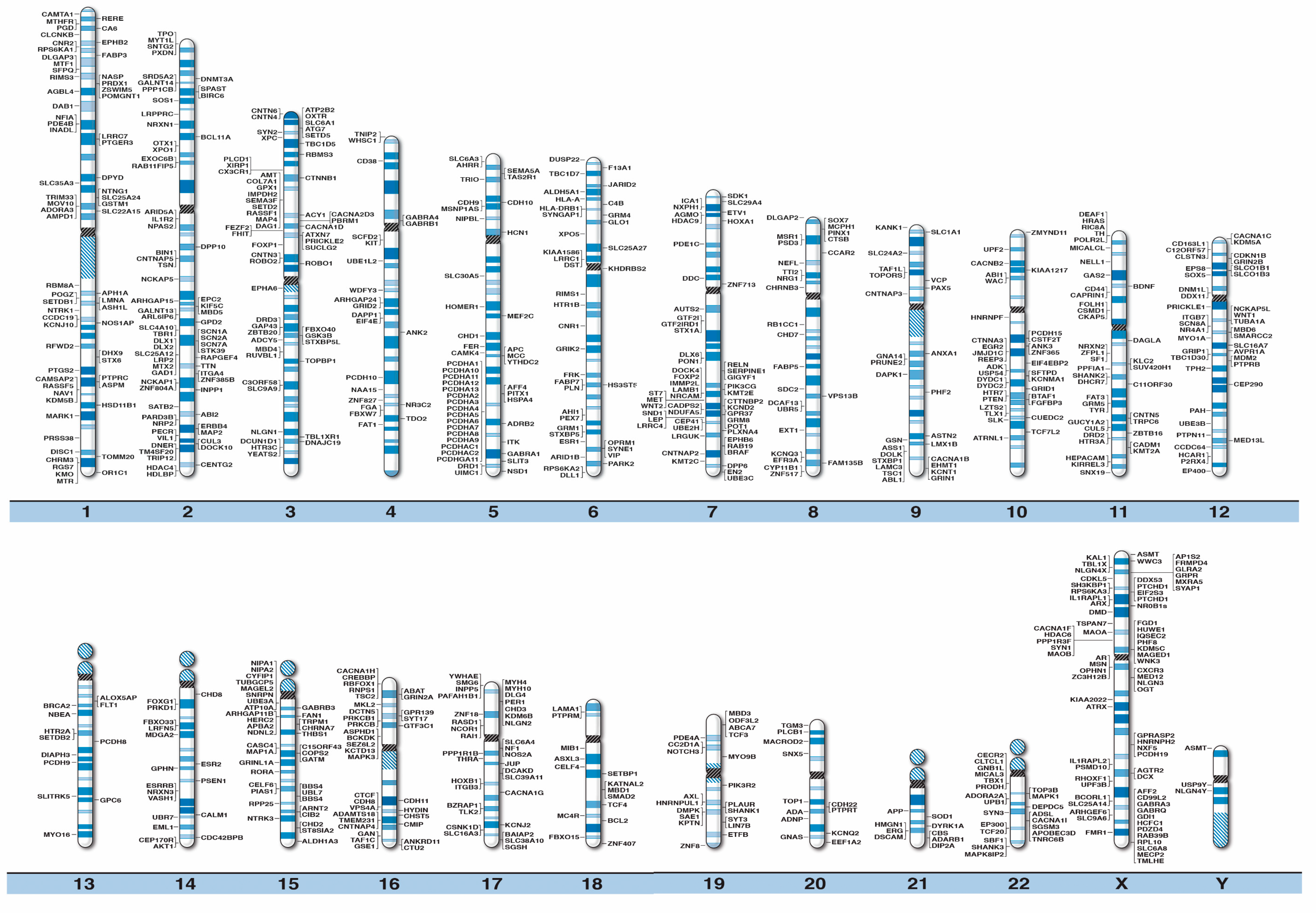
Human genes with links to autism

The heritability of autism is the proportion of differences in expression of autism that can be explained by genetic variation. Autism has a strong genetic basis. Although the genetics of autism are complex, the disorder is explained more by multigene effects than by rare mutations with large effects.

Autism may be influenced by genetics, with studies consistently demonstrating a higher prevalence among siblings and in families with a history of autism. This led researchers to investigate the extent to which genetics contribute to the development of autism. Numerous studies, including twin studies and family studies, have estimated the heritability of autism to be around 80 to 90%, indicating that genetic factors play a substantial role in its etiology. Heritability estimates do not imply that autism is solely determined by genetics, as environmental factors also contribute to the development of the disorder.

Studies of twins from 1977 to 1995 estimated the heritability of autism to be more than 90%; in other words, that 90% of the differences between autistic and non-autistic individuals are due to genetic effects. When only one identical twin is autistic, the other often has learning or social disabilities. For adult siblings, the likelihood of having one or more features of the broader autism phenotype might be as high as 30%, much higher than the likelihood in controls.

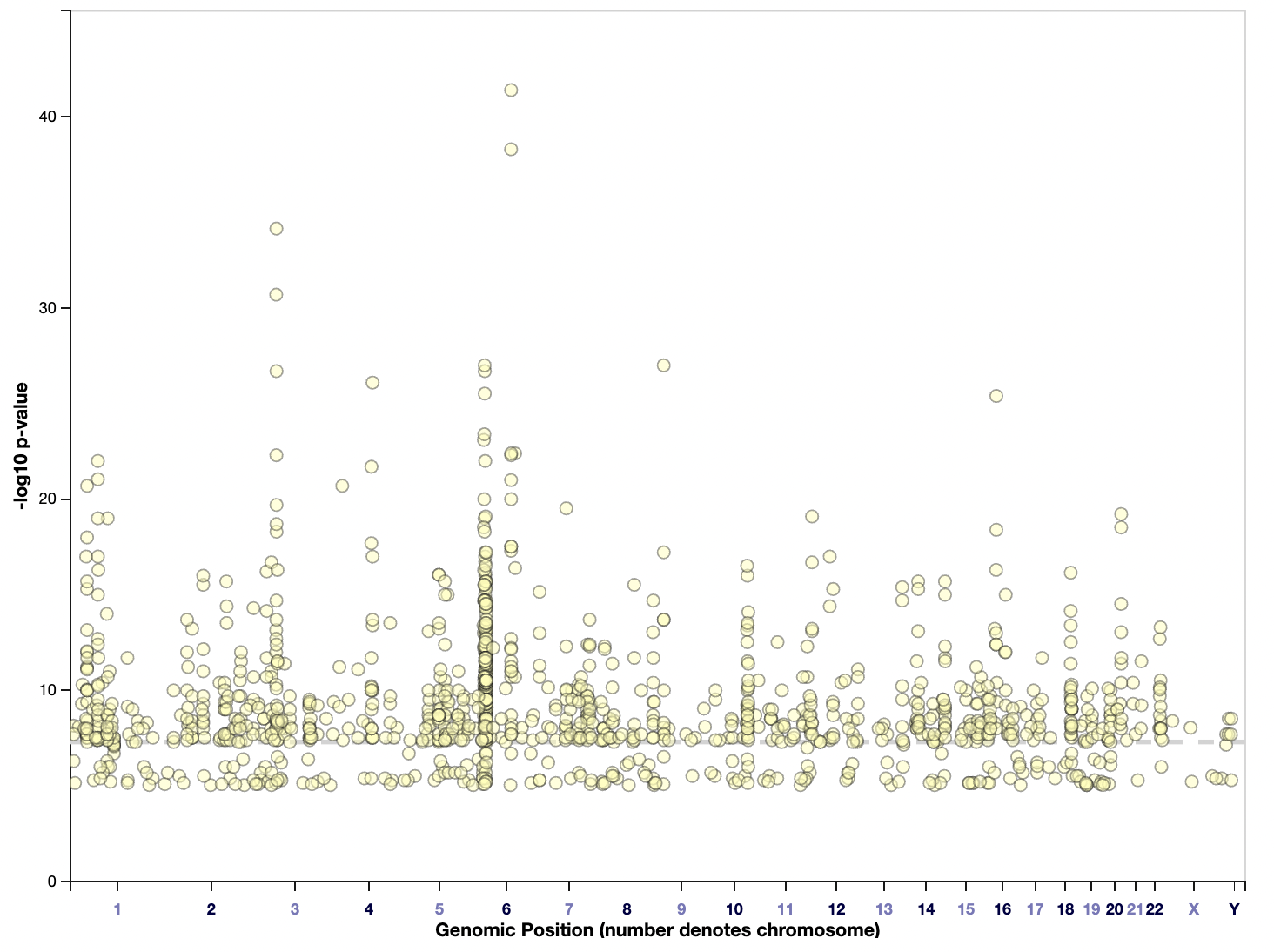
A variety of genetic associations with autism spectrum disorder have been reported. This Manhattan plot shows the statistical significance (but not necessarily the strength) of each variant in a scan across the entire genome. The plot is similar to those in published articles.

Though genetic linkage analyses have been inconclusive, many association analyses have discovered genetic variants associated with autism. For each autistic individual, mutations in many genes are typically implicated. Mutations in different sets of genes may be involved in different autistic individuals. There may be significant interactions among mutations in several genes, or between the environment and mutated genes. By identifying genetic markers inherited with autism in family studies, numerous candidate genes have been located, most of which encode proteins involved in neural development and function. However, for most of the candidate genes, the actual mutations that increase the likelihood for autism have not been identified. Typically, autism cannot be traced to a Mendelian (single-gene) mutation or to single chromosome abnormalities such as fragile X syndrome or 22q13 deletion syndrome.

10–15% of autism cases may result from single gene disorders or copy number variations (CNVs)—spontaneous alterations in the genetic material during meiosis that delete or duplicate genetic material. These sometimes result in syndromic autism, as opposed to the more common idiopathic autism. Sporadic (non-inherited) cases have been examined to identify candidate genetic loci involved in autism. A substantial fraction of autism may be highly heritable but not inherited: that is, the mutation that causes the autism is not present in the parental genome.

Although the fraction of autism traceable to a genetic cause may grow to 30–40% as the resolution of array comparative genomic hybridization (CGH) improves, several results in this area have been described incautiously, possibly misleading the public into thinking that a large proportion of autism is caused by CNVs and is detectable via array CGH, or that detecting CNVs is tantamount to a genetic diagnosis. The Autism Genome Project database contains genetic linkage and CNV data that connect autism to genetic loci and suggest that every human chromosome may be involved. It may be that using autism-related sub-phenotypes instead of the diagnosis of autism per se may be more useful in identifying susceptible loci.

== Twin studies ==
Twin studies provide a unique opportunity to explore the genetic and environmental influences on autism spectrum disorder (ASD). By studying identical twins, who share identical DNA, and fraternal twins, who share about half of their DNA, researchers can estimate the heritability of autism by comparing the rates of when one twin is diagnosed with autism while the other is not in identical vs. fraternal twins. Twin studies are a helpful tool in determining the heritability of disorders and human traits in general. They involve determining concordance of characteristics between identical (monozygotic or MZ) twins and between fraternal (dizygotic or DZ) twins. Possible problems of twin studies are: (1) errors in diagnosis of monozygocity, and (2) the assumption that social environment sharing by DZ twins is equivalent to that of MZ twins.

A condition that is environmentally caused without genetic involvement would yield a concordance for MZ twins equal to the concordance found for DZ twins. In contrast, a condition that is completely genetic in origin would theoretically yield a concordance of 100% for MZ pairs and usually much less for DZ pairs depending on factors such as the number of genes involved and assortative mating.

An example of a condition that appears to have very little if any genetic influence is irritable bowel syndrome (IBS), with a concordance of 28% vs. 27% for MZ and DZ pairs respectively. An example of a human characteristic that is extremely heritable is eye color, with a concordance of 98% for MZ pairs and 7–49% for DZ pairs depending on age.

Identical twin studies put autism's heritability in a range between 36% and 95.7%, with concordance for a broader phenotype usually found at the higher end of the range. Autism concordance in siblings and fraternal twins is anywhere between 0 and 23.5%. This is more likely 2–4% for classic autism and 10–20% for a broader spectrum. Assuming a general-population prevalence of 0.1%, the risk of classic autism in siblings is 20- to 40-fold that of the general population.

Notable twin studies have attempted to shed light on the heritability of autism.

A small-scale study in 1977 was the first of its kind to look into the heritability of autism. It involved 10 DZ twins and 11 MZ twins in which at least one twin in each pair showed infantile autism. It found a concordance of 36% in MZ twins compared to 0% for DZ twins. Concordance of "cognitive abnormalities" was 82% in MZ pairs and 10% for DZ pairs. In 12 of the 17 pairs discordant for autism, a biological hazard was believed to be associated with the condition.

A 1979 case report discussed a pair of identical twins concordant for autism. The twins developed similarly until the age of 4, when one of them spontaneously improved. The other twin, who had had infrequent seizures, remained autistic. The report noted that genetic factors were not "all-important" in the development of twins.

In 1985, a study of twins enrolled with the UCLA Registry for Genetic Studies found a concordance of 95.7% for autism in 23 pairs of MZ twins, and 23.5% for 17 DZ twins.

In a 1989 study, Nordic countries were screened for cases of autism. Eleven pairs of MZ twins and 10 of DZ twins were examined. Concordance of autism was found to be 91% in MZ and 0% in DZ pairs. The concordances for "cognitive disorder" were 91% and 30% respectively. In most of the pairs discordant for autism, the autistic twin had more perinatal stress.

A British twin sample was reexamined in 1995 and a 60% concordance was found for autism in MZ twins vs. 0% concordance for DZ. It also found 92% concordance for a broader spectrum in MZ vs. 10% for DZ. The study concluded that "obstetric hazards usually appear to be consequences of genetically influenced abnormal development, rather than independent aetiological factors."

A 1999 study looked at social cognitive skills in the general-population of children and adolescents. It found "poorer social cognition in males", and a heritability of 0.68 with higher genetic influence in younger twins.

In 2000, a study looked at reciprocal social behavior in general-population identical twins. It found a concordance of 73% for MZ, i.e. "highly heritable", and 37% for DZ pairs.

A 2004 study looked at 16 MZ twins and found a concordance of 43.75% for "strictly defined autism". Neuroanatomical differences (discordant cerebellar white and grey matter volumes) between discordant twins were found. The abstract notes that in previous studies 75% of the non-autistic twins displayed the broader phenotype.

Another 2004 study examined whether the characteristic symptoms of autism (impaired social interaction, communication deficits, and repetitive behaviors) show decreased variance of symptoms among monozygotic twins compared to siblings in a sample of 16 families. The study demonstrated significant aggregation of symptoms in twins. It also concluded that "the levels of clinical features seen in autism may be a result of mainly independent genetic traits."

An English twin study in 2006 found high heritability for autistic traits in a large group of 3,400 pairs of twins.

One critic of the pre-2006 twin studies said that they were too small and their results can be plausibly explained on non-genetic grounds.

In a 2015 meta-analysis of previously conducted twin studies, the authors found that genetics play a substantial role in the development of autism, contributing between 64% to 91% to the chances of developing autism.

In a 2024 study of twins conducted by Martini et al., findings suggests that genetic factors have a greater influence on the stability of autistic traits compared to environmental factors.

== Sibling studies ==
A study of 99 autistic probands which found a 2.9% concordance for autism in siblings, and between 12.4% and 20.4% concordance for a "lesser variant" of autism.

A study of 31 siblings of autistic children, 32 siblings of children with developmental delay, and 32 controls. It found that the siblings of autistic children, as a group, "showed superior spatial and verbal span, but a greater than expected number performed poorly on the set-shifting, planning, and verbal fluency tasks."

A 2005 Danish study looked at "data from the Danish Psychiatric Central Register and the Danish Civil Registration System to study some risk factors of autism, including place of birth, parental place of birth, parental age, family history of psychiatric disorders, and paternal identity." It found an overall prevalence rate of roughly 0.08%. Prevalence of autism in siblings of autistic children was found to be 1.76%. Prevalence of autism among siblings of children with Asperger syndrome or PDD was found to be 1.04%. The risk was twice as high if the mother had been diagnosed with a psychiatric disorder. The study also found that "the risk of autism was associated with increasing degree of urbanisation of the child's place of birth and with increasing paternal, but not maternal, age."

A study in 2007 looked at a database containing pedigrees of 86 families with two or more autistic children and found that 42 of the third-born male children showed autistic symptoms, suggesting that parents had a 50% chance of passing on a mutation to their offspring. The mathematical models suggest that about 50% of autistic cases are caused by spontaneous mutations. The simplest model was to divide parents into two risk classes depending on whether the parent carries a pre-existing mutation that causes autism; it suggested that about a quarter of autistic children have inherited a copy number variation from their parents.

== Other family studies ==
A 1994 study looked at the personalities of parents of autistic children, using parents of children with Down syndrome as controls. Using standardized tests it was found that parents of autistic children were "more aloof, untactful and unresponsive" compared to parents whose children did not have autism.

A 1997 study found higher rates of social and communication deficits and stereotyped behaviors in families with multiple-incidence autism.

Autism was found to occur more often in families of physicists, engineers and scientists. 12.5% of the fathers and 21.2% of the grandfathers (both paternal and maternal) of children with autism were engineers, compared to 5% of the fathers and 2.5% of the grandfathers of children with other syndromes. Other studies have yielded similar results. Findings of this nature have led to the coinage of the term "geek syndrome".

A 2001 study of brothers and parents of autistic boys looked into the phenotype in terms of one current cognitive theory of autism. The study raised the possibility that the broader autism phenotype may include a "cognitive style" (weak central coherence) that can confer information-processing advantages.

Overlaps in the phenotypes of genes associated with autism and other disorders, including obsessive-compulsive disorder and depression

A study in 2005 showed a positive correlation between repetitive behaviors in autistic individuals and obsessive-compulsive behaviors in parents. Another 2005 study focused on sub-threshold autistic traits in the general population. It found that correlation for social impairment or competence between parents and their children and between spouses is about 0.4.

A 2005 report examined the family psychiatric history of 58 subjects with Asperger syndrome (AS) diagnosed according to DSM-IV criteria. Three (5%) had first-degree relatives with AS. Nine (19%) had a family history of schizophrenia. Thirty five (60%) had a family history of depression. Out of 64 siblings, 4 (6.25%) were diagnosed with AS. According to a 2022 study held on 86 mother-child dyads across 18 months, "prior maternal depression didn't predict child behavior problems later."

== Twinning risk ==
It has been suggested that the twinning process itself is a risk factor in the development of autism, presumably due to perinatal factors. However, three large-scale epidemiological studies have refuted this idea. These studies took place in California, Sweden, and Australia. One study done in Western Australia, utilized the Maternal and Child Health Research Database that houses birth records for all infants born, including infants and later children diagnosed with autism spectrum disorder. During this study, the population analyzed for the incidence of Autism Spectrum Disorder was restricted to those children with birth years between 1980 and 1995. The focus was on the incidence of autism spectrum disorder in the twin population in comparison to the non twin population. The following two studies, explored the risk of Autism spectrum disorder in the twin population. The conclusion that the twinning process alone is not a risk factor was drawn. In these studies the data exemplified that both MZ twins will have autism spectrum disorder, but only one of the DZ twins will have autism spectrum disorder with an incidence rate of 90% in MZ twins compared to 0% in DZ twins. The high symmetry in MZ twins can explain the high symmetry of autism spectrum disorder in MZ twins outcome compared to DZ twins and non twin siblings.

== Proposed models ==
Twin and family studies show that autism is a highly heritable condition, but they have left many questions for researchers, most notably:

- Why is fraternal twin concordance so low considering that identical twin concordance is high?
- Why are parents of autistic children typically non-autistic?
- Which factors could be involved in the failure to find a 100% concordance in identical twins?
- Is profound intellectual disability a characteristic of the genotype or something totally independent?

Clues to the first two questions come from studies that have shown that at least 30% of individuals with autism have spontaneous de novo mutations that occurred in the father's sperm or mother's egg that disrupt important genes for brain development. These spontaneous mutations are likely to cause autism in families where there is no family history of the disorder.

The concordance between identical twins is not quite 100% for two reasons, because these mutations have variable 'expressivity' and their effects manifest differently due to chance effects, epigenetic, and environmental factors. Also spontaneous mutations can potentially occur specifically in one embryo and not the other after conception. The likelihood of developing intellectual disability is dependent on the importance of the gene to brain development and how the mutation changes this function, also playing a role is the genetic and environmental background upon which a mutation occurs. The recurrence of the same mutations in multiple individuals affected by autism has led Brandler and Sebat to suggest that the spectrum of autism is breaking up into quanta of many different genetic disorders.

=== Single genes ===
The most parsimonious explanation for cases of autism where a single child is affected and there is no family history or affected siblings is that a single spontaneous mutation that impacts one or multiple genes is a significant contributing factor, termed a de novo mutation. Tens of individual genes or mutations have been definitively identified and are cataloged by the Simons Foundation Autism Research Initiative.

Examples of autism that has arisen from a rare or de novo mutation in a single-gene or locus include neurodevelopmental disorders like fragile X syndrome; metabolic conditions (for example, propionic acidemia); and chromosomal disorders like 22q13 deletion syndrome and 16p11.2 deletion syndrome.

Deletion (1), duplication (2) and inversion (3) are all chromosome abnormalities that have been implicated in autism.

These mutations themselves are characterized by considerable variability in clinical outcome and typically only a subset of mutation carriers meet criteria for autism. For example, carriers of the 16p11.2 deletion have a mean IQ 32 points lower than their first-degree relatives that do not carry the deletion, however only 20% are below the threshold IQ of 70 for intellectual disability, and only 20% have autism. Around 85% have a neurobehavioral diagnosis, including autism, ADHD, anxiety disorders, mood disorders, gross motor delay, and epilepsy, while 15% have no diagnosis. Alongside these neurobehavioral phenotypes, the 16p11.2 deletions / duplications have been associated with macrocephaly / microcephaly, body weight regulation, and the duplication in particular is associated with schizophrenia. Controls that carry mutations associated with autism or schizophrenia typically present with intermediate cognitive phenotypes or fecundity compared to neurodevelopmental cases and population controls. Therefore, a single mutation can have multiple different effects depending on other genetic and environmental factors.

=== Multigene interactions ===
In this model, autism often arises from a combination of common, functional variants of genes. Each gene contributes a relatively small effect in increasing the risk of autism. In this model, no single gene directly regulates any core symptom of autism such as social behavior. Instead, each gene encodes a protein that disrupts a cellular process, and the combination of these disruptions, possibly together with environmental influences, affect key developmental processes such as synapse formation. For example, one model is that many mutations affect MET and other receptor tyrosine kinases, which in turn converge on disruption of ERK and PI3K signaling.

=== Two family types ===
In this model most families fall into two types: in the majority, sons have a low risk of autism, but in a small minority their risk is near 50%. In the low-risk families, sporadic autism is mainly caused by spontaneous mutation with poor penetrance in daughters and high penetrance in sons. The high-risk families come from (mostly female) children who carry a new causative mutation but are unaffected and transmit the dominant mutation to grandchildren.

=== Epigenetic ===
Several epigenetic models of autism have been proposed. These are suggested by the occurrence of autism in individuals with fragile X syndrome, which arises from epigenetic mutations, and with Rett syndrome, which involves epigenetic regulation factors. An epigenetic model would help explain why standard genetic screening strategies have so much difficulty with autism.

=== Genomic imprinting ===
Genomic imprinting models have been proposed; one of their strengths is explaining the high male-to-female ratio in ASD. One hypothesis is that autism is in some sense diametrically opposite to schizophrenia and other psychotic-spectrum conditions, that alterations of genomic imprinting help to mediate the development of these two sets of conditions, and that ASD involves increased effects of paternally expressed genes, which regulate overgrowth in the brain, whereas schizophrenia involves maternally expressed genes and undergrowth.

=== Environmental interactions ===
Though autism's genetic factors explain most of autism risk, they do not explain all of it. A common hypothesis is that autism is caused by the interaction of a genetic predisposition and an early environmental insult. Several theories based on environmental factors have been proposed to address the remaining risk. Some of these theories focus on prenatal environmental factors, such as agents that cause birth defects; others focus on the environment after birth, such as children's diets. All known teratogens (agents that cause birth defects) related to the risk of autism appear to act during the first eight weeks from conception, strong evidence that autism arises very early in development. Although evidence for other environmental causes is anecdotal and has not been confirmed by reliable studies, extensive searches are underway. A 2015 study has found evidence that non-shared environmental factors has an influence on social impairments in ASD

=== Sex bias ===
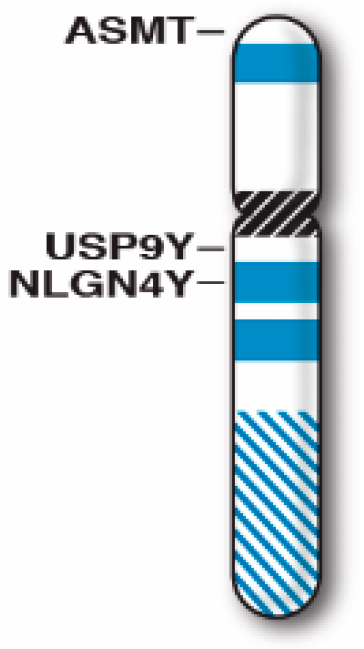
Genes associated with autism on the human Y chromosome

Autism spectrum disorder affects all races, ethnicities, and socioeconomic groups. Still, more males than females are affected across all cultures, the ratios of males-to-females is appropriately 3 to 1. A study analyzed the Autism Genetics Resource Exchange (AGRE database), which holds resources, research, and records of autism spectrum disorder diagnosis. In this study, it was concluded that when a spontaneous mutation causes autism spectrum disorder (ASD), there is high penetrance in males and low penetrance in females. A study published in 2020 explored the reason behind this idea further. It is commonly known that the main difference between males and females is the fact that males have one X and one Y sex chromosome whereas female have two X chromosomes. This leads to the idea that there is a gene on the X chromosome that is not on the Y that is involved with the sex bias of ASD.

In another study, it has been found that the gene called NLGN4, when mutated, can cause ASD. This gene and other NLGN genes are important for neuron communications. This NLGN4 gene is found on both the X (NLGN4X) and the Y (NLGN4Y) chromosome. The sex chromosomes are 97% identical. It has been determined that most of the mutations that occur are located on the NLGN4X gene. Research into the differences between NLGN4X and NLGN4Y found that the NLGN4Y protein has poor surface expectations and poor synapses regulations, leading to poor neuron communication. Researchers concluded that males have a higher incidence of autism when the mechanism is NLGN4X-associated. This association was concluded since females have two X chromosomes; if there is a mutation in a gene on an X chromosome, the other X chromosome can be used to compensate for the mutation. Whereas males have only one X chromosome, meaning that if there is a mutation in a gene on an X chromosome, then that is the only copy of the gene and it will be used. The genomic difference between males and females is one mechanism that leads to the higher incidence of ASD in males.

== Candidate gene loci ==
Known genetic syndromes, mutations, and metabolic diseases account for up to 20% of autism cases. A number of alleles have been shown to have strong linkage to the autism phenotype. In many cases the findings are inconclusive, with some studies showing no linkage. Alleles linked so far strongly support the assertion that there is a large number of genotypes that are manifested as the autism phenotype. At least some of the alleles associated with autism are fairly prevalent in the general population, which indicates they are not rare pathogenic mutations. This also presents some challenges in identifying all the rare allele combinations involved in the etiology of autism.

A 2008 study compared genes linked with autism to those of other neurological diseases, and found that more than half of known autism genes are implicated in other disorders, suggesting that the other disorders may share molecular mechanisms with autism.

=== Primary ===
Gene	OMIM/#	Locus	Description
CDH9, CDH10		5p14.1	A 2009 pair of genome-wide association studies found an association between autism and six single-nucleotide polymorphisms in an intergenic region between CDH10 (cadherin 10) and CDH9 (cadherin 9). These genes encode neuronal cell-adhesion molecules, implicating these molecules in the mechanism of autism.
CDH8		16q21	A family based study identified a deletion of CDH8 that was transmitted to three out of three affected children and zero out of four unaffected siblings. Further evidence for the role of CDH8 comes from a spontaneous 1.52 megabase inversion that disrupts the gene in an affected child.
MAPK3		16p11.2	A 2008 study observed a de novo deletion of 593 kb on this chromosome in about 1% of persons with autism, and similarly for the reciprocal duplication of the region. Another 2008 study also found duplications and deletions associated with ASD at this locus. This gene encodes ERK1, one of the extracellular signal regulated kinase subfamily of mitogen-activated protein kinases which are central elements of an intracellular signaling pathways that transmits signals from cell surfaces to interiors. 1% of autistic children have been found to have either a loss or duplication in a region of chromosome 16 that encompasses the gene for ERK1. A similar disturbance in this pathway is also found in neuro-cardio-facial-cutaneous syndromes (NCFC), which are characterized by cranio-facial development disturbances that also can be found in some cases of autism.
SERT (SLC6A4)		17q11.2	This gene locus has been associated with rigid-compulsive behaviors. Notably, it has also been associated with depression but only as a result of social adversity, although other studies have found no link. Significant linkage in families with only affected males has been shown. Researchers have also suggested that the gene contributes to hyperserotonemia. However, a 2008 meta-analysis of family- and population-based studies found no significant overall association between autism and either the promoter insertion/deletion (5-HTTLPR) or the intron 2 VNTR (STin2 VNTR) polymorphisms.
CACNA1G		17q21.33	Markers within an interval containing this gene are associated with ASD at a locally significant level. The region likely harbors a combination of multiple rare and common alleles that contribute to genetic risk for ASD.
GABRB3, GABRA4		multiple	GABA is the primary inhibitory neurotransmitter of the human brain. Ma et al. (2005) concluded that GABRA4 is involved in the etiology of autism, and that it potentially increases autism risk through interaction with GABRB1. The GABRB3 gene has been associated with savant skills. The GABRB3 gene deficient mouse has been proposed as a model of ASD.
EN2		7q36.2	Engrailed 2 is believed to be associated with cerebellar development. Benayed et al.. (2005) estimate that this gene contributes to as many as 40% of ASD cases, about twice the prevalence of the general population. But at least one study has found no association.
?		3q25-27	A number of studies have shown a significant linkage of autism and Asperger syndrome with this locus. The most prominent markers are in the vicinity of D3S3715 and D3S3037.
RELN		7q21-q36	In adults, Reelin glycoprotein is believed to be involved in memory formation, neurotransmission, and synaptic plasticity. A number of studies have shown an association between the REELIN gene and autism, but a couple of studies were unable to duplicate linkage findings.
SLC25A12		2q31	This gene encodes the mitochondrial aspartate/glutamate carrier (AGC1). It has been found to have a significant linkage to autism in some studies, but linkage was not replicated in others, and a 2007 study found no compelling evidence of an association of any mitochondrial haplogroup in autism.
HOXA1 and HOXB1		multiple	A link has been found between HOX genes and the development of the embryonic brain stem. In particular, two genes, HOXA1 and HOXB1, in transgenic 'knockout' mice, engineered so that these genes were absent from the genomes of the mice in question, exhibited very specific brain stem developmental differences from the norm, which were directly comparable to the brain stem differences discovered in a human brain stem originating from a diagnosed autistic patient. Conciatori et al.. (2004) found an association of HOXA1 with increased head circumference. A number of studies have found no association with autism. The possibility remains that single allelic variants of the HOXA1 gene are insufficient alone to trigger the developmental events in the embryo now associated with autistic spectrum conditions. Tischfield et al.. published a paper which suggests that because HOXA1 is implicated in a wide range of developmental mechanisms, a model involving multiple allelic variants of HOXA1 in particular may provide useful insights into the heritability mechanisms involved. Additionally, Ingram et al.. alighted upon additional possibilities in this arena. Transgenic mouse studies indicate that there is redundancy spread across HOX genes that complicate the issue, and that complex interactions between these genes could play a role in determining whether or not a person inheriting the requisite combinations manifests an autistic spectrum condition—transgenic mice with mutations in both HOXA1 and HOXB1 exhibit far more profound developmental anomalies than those in which only one of the genes differs from the conserved 'norm'. In Rodier's original work, teratogens are considered to play a part in addition, and that the possibility remains open for a range of teratogens to interact with the mechanisms controlled by these genes unfavourably (this has already been demonstrated using valproic acid, a known teratogen, in the mouse model).
PRKCB1		16p11.2	Philippi et al. (2005) found a strong association between this gene and autism. This is a recent finding that needs to be replicated.
TAOK2		16p11.2	Richter et al. (2018) found a strong association between this gene and autism.
MECP2	300496, AUTSX3	Xq28	Mutations in this gene can give rise to autism spectrum disorders and related postnatal neurodevelopmental disorders.
UBE3A		15q11.2–q13	The maternally expressed imprinted gene UBE3A has been associated with Angelman syndrome. MeCP2 deficiency results in reduced expression of UBE3A in some studies.
SHANK3 (ProSAP2)		22q13	The gene called SHANK3 (also designated ProSAP2) regulates the structural organization of neurotransmitter receptors in post-synaptic dendritic spines making it a key element in chemical binding crucial to nerve cell communication. SHANK3 is also a binding partner of chromosome 22q13 (i.e. a specific section of Chromosome 22) and neuroligin proteins; deletions and mutations of SHANK3, 22q13 (i.e. a specific section of Chromosome 22) and genes encoding neuroligins have been found in some people with autism spectrum disorders. Mutations in the SHANK3 gene have been strongly associated with the autism spectrum disorders. If the SHANK3 gene is not adequately passed to a child from the parent (haploinsufficiency) there will possibly be significant neurological changes that are associated with yet another gene, 22q13, which interacts with SHANK3. Alteration or deletion of either will effect changes in the other. A deletion of a single copy of a gene on chromosome 22q13 has been correlated with global developmental delay, severely delayed speech or social communication disorders and moderate to profound delay of cognitive abilities. Behavior is described as "autistic-like" and includes high tolerance to pain and habitual chewing or mouthing (see also 22q13 deletion syndrome). This appears to be connected to the fact that signal transmission between nerve cells is altered with the absence of 22q13. SHANK3 proteins also interact with neuroligins at the synapses of the brain further complicating the widespread effects of changes at the genetic level and beyond.
NLGN3	300425, AUTSX1	Xq13	Neuroligin is a cell surface protein (homologous to acetylcholinesterase and other esterases) that binds to synaptic membranes. Neuroligins organize postsynaptic membranes that function to transmit nerve cell messages (excitatory) and stop those transmissions (inhibitory); In this way, neuroligins help to ensure signal transitions between nerve cells. Neuroligins also regulate the maturation of synapses and ensure there are sufficient receptor proteins on the synaptic membrane. Mice with a neuroligin-3 mutation exhibit poor social skills but increased intelligence. Though not present in all individuals with autism, these mutations hold potential to illustrate some of the genetic components of spectrum disorders. However, a 2008 study found no evidence for involvement of neuroligin-3 and neuroligin-4x with high-functioning ASD.
MET		7q31	The MET gene (MET receptor tyrosine kinase gene) linked to brain development, regulation of the immune system, and repair of the gastrointestinal system, has been linked to autism. This MET gene codes for a protein that relays signals that turn on a cell's internal machinery. Impairing the receptor's signaling interferes with neuron migration and disrupts neuronal growth in the cerebral cortex and similarly shrinks the cerebellum—abnormalities also seen in autism. It is also known to play a key role in both normal and abnormal development, such as cancer metastases. A mutation of the gene, rendering it less active, has been found to be common amongst children with autism. Mutation in the MET gene demonstrably raises risk of autism by 2.27 times.
NRXN1		2q32	In February 2007, researchers in the Autism Genome Project (an international research team composed of 137 scientists in 50 institutions) reported possible implications in aberrations of a brain-development gene called neurexin 1 as a cause of some cases of autism. Linkage analysis was performed on DNA from 1,181 families in what was the largest-scale genome scan conducted in autism research at the time. The objective of the study was to locate specific brain cells involved in autism to find regions in the genome linked to autism susceptibility genes. The focus of the research was copy number variations (CNVs), extra or missing parts of genes. Each person does not actually have just an exact copy of genes from each parent. Each person also has occasional multiple copies of one or more genes or some genes are missing altogether. The research team attempted to locate CNVs when they scanned the DNA. Neurexin 1 is one of the genes that may be involved in communication between nerve cells (neurons). Neurexin 1 and other genes like it are very important in determining how the brain is connected from cell to cell, and in the chemical transmission of information between nerve cells. These genes are particularly active very early in brain development, either in utero or in the first months or couple of years of life. In some families their autistic child had only one copy of the neurexin 1 gene. Besides locating another possible genetic influence (the findings were statistically insignificant), the research also reinforced the theory that autism involves many forms of genetic variations. A 2008 study implicated the neurexin 1 gene in two independent subjects with ASD, and suggested that subtle changes to the gene might contribute to susceptibility to ASD. A Neurexin 1 deletion has been observed occurring spontaneously in an unaffected mother and was passed on to an affected child, suggesting that the mutation has incomplete penetrance.
CNTNAP2		7q35-q36	Multiple 2008 studies have identified a series of functional variants in the CNTNAP2 gene, a member of the neurexin superfamily, that implicate it as contributing to autism.
FOXP2		7q31	The FOXP2 gene is of interest because it is known to be associated with developmental language and speech deficits. A 2008 study found that FOXP2 binds to and down-regulates CNTNAP2, and that the FOXP2-CNTNAP2 pathway links distinct syndromes involving disrupted language.
GSTP1		11q13	A 2007 study suggested that the GSTP1*A haplotype of the glutathione S-transferase P1 gene (GSTP1) acts in the mother during pregnancy and increases the likelihood of autism in the child.
PRL, PRLR, OXTR		multiple	A 2014 meta-analysis found significant associations between autism and several single-nucleotide polymorphisms in the OXTR gene.

=== Others ===
There is a large number of other candidate loci which either should be looked at or have been shown to be promising. Several genome-wide scans have been performed identifying markers across many chromosomes.

A few examples of loci that have been studied are the 17q21 region, the 3p24-26 locus, PTEN, 15q11.2–q13 and deletion in the 22q11.2 area.

Homozygosity mapping in pedigrees with shared ancestry and autism incidence has recently implicated the following candidate genes: PCDH10, DIA1 (formerly known as C3ORF58), NHE9, CNTN3, SCN7A, and RNF8. Several of these genes appeared to be targets of MEF2, one of the transcription factors known to be regulated by neuronal activity and that itself has also recently been implicated as an autism-related disorder candidate gene.
