= CDH10 =

Protein-coding gene in humans

Identifiers
- Aliases: CDH10, cadherin 10
- External IDs: OMIM: 604555; MGI: 107436; GeneCards: CDH10

Gene location (Human)
Chr.	Chromosome 5 (human)
Band	5p14.2-p14.1	Start	24,487,100 bp
Band	5p14.2-p14.1	End	24,644,978 bp

Gene location (Mouse)
Chr.	Chromosome 15 (mouse)
Band	15 A2|15 8.2 cM	Start	18,819,033 bp
Band	15 A2|15 8.2 cM	End	19,014,322 bp
RNA expression pattern
Bgee	Human / Mouse (ortholog); Top expressed in: Brodmann area 23; middle temporal gyrus; Brodmann area 46; orbitofrontal cortex; superior frontal gyrus; cerebellar hemisphere; entorhinal cortex; right hemisphere of cerebellum; prefrontal cortex; dorsolateral prefrontal cortex / Top expressed in: Subplate; barrel cortex; prefrontal cortex; Region I of hippocampus proper; facial motor nucleus; ventral tegmental area; anterior horn of spinal cord; primary motor cortex; dorsal tegmental nucleus; deep cerebellar nuclei; More reference expression data
BioGPS	n/a
Gene ontology
Molecular function	calcium ion binding; metal ion binding; cytoskeletal protein binding; protein homodimerization activity; cadherin binding
Cellular component	integral component of membrane; plasma membrane; membrane; glutamatergic synapse; GABA-ergic synapse; integral component of presynaptic active zone membrane; integral component of postsynaptic specialization membrane; cell surface; catenin complex
Biological process	cell adhesion; adherens junction organization; homophilic cell adhesion via plasma membrane adhesion molecules; cell-cell adhesion; cell-cell junction assembly; calcium-dependent cell-cell adhesion via plasma membrane cell adhesion molecules; cell-cell adhesion mediated by cadherin; cell morphogenesis
Sources:Amigo / QuickGO
Orthologs
Databases	NCBI: entry; OMA: entry
Species	Human	Mouse
Entrez	1008	320873
Ensembl	ENSG00000040731	ENSMUSG00000022321
UniProt	Q9Y6N8	P70408
RefSeq (mRNA)	NM_001190450; NM_006727; NM_001317222; NM_001317224; NM_001362460	NM_009865; NM_001316758
RefSeq (protein)	NP_001304151; NP_001304153; NP_006718; NP_001349389; NP_001304153.1	NP_001303687; NP_033995
Location (UCSC)	Chr 5: 24.49 – 24.64 Mb	Chr 15: 18.82 – 19.01 Mb
PubMed search
- Wikidata
View/Edit Human	View/Edit Mouse

Cadherin 10 is a protein that in humans is encoded by the CDH10 gene.

== Clinical significance ==
An association with autism has been suggested.

== See also ==
- Cadherin
- Heritability of autism
