= CDH9 =

Protein-coding gene in humans

Identifiers
- Aliases: CDH9, cadherin 9
- External IDs: OMIM: 609974; MGI: 107433; GeneCards: CDH9

Gene location (Human)
Chr.	Chromosome 5 (human)
Band	5p14.1	Start	26,880,597 bp
Band	5p14.1	End	27,121,150 bp

Gene location (Mouse)
Chr.	Chromosome 15 (mouse)
Band	15|15 A2	Start	16,728,842 bp
Band	15|15 A2	End	16,857,180 bp
RNA expression pattern
Bgee	Human / Mouse (ortholog); Top expressed in: endothelial cell; prefrontal cortex; testicle; dorsolateral prefrontal cortex; anterior cingulate cortex; Brodmann area 9; right frontal lobe; nucleus accumbens; Brodmann area 23; middle temporal gyrus / Top expressed in: dentate gyrus of hippocampal formation granule cell; supraoptic nucleus; lumbar spinal ganglion; temporal lobe; hippocampus proper; anterior amygdaloid area; prefrontal cortex; barrel cortex; subiculum; substantia nigra; More reference expression data
BioGPS	n/a
Gene ontology
Molecular function	calcium ion binding; metal ion binding; molecular function; cytoskeletal protein binding; protein homodimerization activity; cadherin binding
Cellular component	integral component of membrane; plasma membrane; membrane; integral component of postsynaptic membrane; integral component of presynaptic membrane; cell surface; catenin complex
Biological process	cell adhesion; adherens junction organization; homophilic cell adhesion via plasma membrane adhesion molecules; cell-cell adhesion; synapse assembly; synaptic membrane adhesion; cell-cell junction assembly; calcium-dependent cell-cell adhesion via plasma membrane cell adhesion molecules; cell-cell adhesion mediated by cadherin; cell morphogenesis
Sources:Amigo / QuickGO
Orthologs
Databases	NCBI: entry; OMA: entry
Species	Human	Mouse
Entrez	1007	12565
Ensembl	ENSG00000113100	ENSMUSG00000025370
UniProt	Q9ULB4	P70407
RefSeq (mRNA)	NM_016279	NM_009869
RefSeq (protein)	NP_057363	NP_033999
Location (UCSC)	Chr 5: 26.88 – 27.12 Mb	Chr 15: 16.73 – 16.86 Mb
PubMed search
- Wikidata
View/Edit Human	View/Edit Mouse

Cadherin 9 is a protein that in humans is encoded by the CDH9 gene.

== Clinical significance ==
An association with autism has been suggested.

== See also ==
- Cadherin
- Heritability of autism
