= Diagnostic substitution =

Diagnostic substitution is a phenomenon in which one label for a condition becomes replaced with another, causing an apparent decrease in the rate of the first condition and increase in the rate of the second.

== Autism ==
The best-known example is that of the increasing rates of autism in developed countries such as the United States, which some studies suggest is at least partly a result of people substituting diagnoses of autism for intellectual disability and learning disabilities. While a pilot study by the MIND Institute published in 2002 concluded that "There is no evidence that loosening in diagnostic criteria contributed to an increase in the number of children with autism," this study used data from the California Department of Developmental Services database, which, according to a study by Paul Shattuck, is unreliable because "...the administrative prevalence figures for most states are well below epidemiological estimates." With regard to the role of diagnostic substitution in the increase in reported cases of autism, Dorothy Bishop has said, "This could be in part because of new conceptualisations of autism, but may also be fuelled by strategic considerations: resources for children with ASD tend to be much better than those for children with other related conditions, such as language impairment or intellectual handicaps, so this diagnosis may be preferred." Bishop has herself published a small study concluding that people who would now be diagnosed as autistic would, in the past, have been diagnosed with developmental language disorder. Emily Willingham has noted that at the time autism was first reported by Leo Kanner in 1943, while autistic people existed before that time, they had historically been referred to as insane, schizophrenic, intellectually disabled, or language impaired.
