= The Informed Parent =

Parenting book published by Perigee Books

The Informed Parent is a parenting book written by Tara Haelle and Emily Willingham and published by the Penguin Group imprint Perigee Books on April 5, 2016.

== Background ==
The book is written chronologically from pregnancy to toddlerhood. A range of topics are covered in the book such as whether it's safe to dye your hair during pregnancy, whether to use a pacifier, and when to start toilet training. Each section has a "What We Did" paragraph at the end of it where the authors note what worked and what didn't work for them.

The authors encourage the use of vaccines and emphasize that the immunization schedule has been thoroughly tested. According to the studies that Haelle and Willingham used to write the book, the father experiences greater levels of sleep deprivation than the mother in the United States. The book discusses the differences between breast feeding and formula feeding, and the authors' conclusions are that there are benefits to either one and that the benefits of breast feeding is over exaggerated.

== Reception ==
The Publishers Weekly review criticised the book saying that the book's contents are poorly organized and the book lacked the necessary footnotes to properly support and verify its claims. Sarah Kuppen praised the book in The Conversation saying that the book made the research "easy to digest" and the authors did a good job of balancing the research with personal anecdotes.
