= Tara Haelle =

American writer

Tara Susan Haelle
- Born: January 20, 1978 (age 48); Alameda County, California, U.S.
- Education: University of Texas at Austin (BA, MA)
- Occupations: Photojournalist, educator, author
- Writing career
- Language: English
- Website: tarahaelle.net

Tara Susan Haelle, known professionally as Tara Haelle, (born January 20, 1978) is an American photojournalist, educator, author, and science writer. Haelle, along with co-author Emily Willingham, published The Informed Parent: A Science-Based Resource for Your Child's First Four Years, which examines several child raising controversies. She examined the history and science of vaccines in a 2018 book entitled Vaccination investigation. In addition, Haelle has written several children's educational books, including Edible Sunlight, and Seasons, Tides, and Lunar Phases.

== Biography ==
Tara Haelle was born in Alameda County, California in 1978. She earned a Bachelor of Arts in English at the University of Texas at Austin and a Master of Arts in photojournalism, also from the University of Texas. She has also written four articles for Scientific American.

Haelle and Willingham's book, Informed Parent has received generally positive reviews from various book reviewers. According to noted vaccine researcher, Dr. Paul Offit, "In The Informed Parent, journalists Tara Haelle and Emily Willingham manage to answer everything a parent could possibly be worried about during pregnancy, birth, infancy, and toddlerhood. What makes this book different from every other book on this subject (and there are many) is that the authors take on not only the science of what concerns us, but encourage us to think along with them—giving us the tools to answer other questions in the future. It was like reading the answer sheet before the test."

Haelle co-authored a paper that examined the effects of images in vaccine newspaper and magazine articles. It found that one in eight articles had negative images of vaccines.

== Blogs ==
She is a writer at Forbes.com, Everyday Health, and numerous other websites. Haelle blogs about science, child rearing, childbirth, and vaccines at Forbes and Red Wine and Applesauce. Much of her writing is about vaccine controversies, usually examining and reviewing published articles about various vaccines. She has criticized noted anti-vaccination activist Dr. Bob Sears and critiqued the controversial documentary Vaxxed.

== Publications ==
- Haelle, Tara (2016). Seasons, tides, and lunar phases. Vero Beach, FL: Rourke Educational Media. ISBN 978-1-68191-437-4. OCLC 942554829.
- Haelle, Tara (2016). Edible sunlight. Place of publication not identified: Rourke Pub Group. ISBN 978-1-68191-441-1. OCLC 935987258.
- Haelle, Tara; Willingham, Emily (2016). The Informed Parent: A Science-Based Resource for Your Child's First Four Years. New York, NY: A TarcherPerigee Book. ISBN 978-0-399-17106-2. OCLC 913924770.
- Haelle, Tara (2017). Insects as parasites. North Mankota, Minnesota: Rourke Educational Media. ISBN 978-1-68191-797-9. OCLC 960301371.
- Haelle, Tara (2017). Energy Exchange. North Mankato, MN: Rourke Pub Group. ISBN 978-1-68342-445-1. OCLC 978289124.
- Haelle, Tara (2017). Insects as predators. Vero Beach, FL: Rourke Educational Media. ISBN 978-1-68191-695-8. OCLC 948773665.
- Haelle, Tara (2018). Matter changing states. North Mankato, MN: Rourke Educational Media. ISBN 978-1-68342-441-3. OCLC 1005142075.
- Haelle, Tara (2018). Vaccination investigation: the history and science of vaccines. Minneapolis: Twenty-First Century Books. ISBN 978-1-5124-2530-7. OCLC 972640214.
- Haelle, Tara (2018). MELTING GLACIERS, RISING SEAS. North Mankato, MN: ROURKE PUB GROUP. ISBN 978-1-64156-574-5. OCLC 1031344121.
- Haelle, Tara (2018). Turning Up the Heat (Taking Earth's Temperature). North Mankato, MN: ROURKE PUB GROUP. ISBN 978-1-64156-573-8.
- Haelle, Tara, "This Is the Moment the Anti-Vaccine Movement Has Been Waiting For" New York Times Aug. 31, 2021 online
