= Broader autism phenotype =

Informal classification for people with autistic traits

The broader autism phenotype (BAP) is an informal classification that covers people who have some traits similar to autism, but who do not meet the diagnostic criteria for autism spectrum disorder. It falls in between typical behaviors and autism itself.

This informal label is mainly used to describe the family members of formally diagnosed autistic people and who show some autistic characteristics, rather than people in the general population with the same characteristics. These family members often have subtler differences and difficulties in social communication and social-emotional abilities. They may have some restricted and repetitive behaviors (RRBs), obsessional behaviors, or behavioral rigidity. BAP can be considered a subclinical form of autism; however, following broadening definitions of autism, some people who were once considered to have a broader autism phenotype may be eligible for a diagnosis of autism.

People exhibiting the broader autism phenotype are sometimes described as having atypical autism, autistic traits, subthreshold manifestations of autism spectrum disorder, or autistic-like features.

== Characteristics ==
People exhibiting the broader autism phenotype usually have autism-like traits that are not significant enough to qualify for a diagnosis of autism. For example, they may seem aloof, reserved, or standoffish to others. Commonly, language and communication skills display limitations. For example, people with the broader autism phenotype are more likely than average to have difficulty learning to read or to spell or with understanding stories. However, while a diagnosis of autism requires a significant level of impairment over multiple criteria, people may be identified as having BAP if they meet only one criterion related to social functioning, communication, cognition, or interests and behaviors, or if their behavior is too close to typical to qualify for a diagnosis.

Cognitively, people with BAP may also show rigid thinking and behavioral patterns, which can manifest as perfectionism or obsessions. They may prefer to focus on details rather than the bigger picture. Their thinking patterns may be inflexible, and they may have difficulties in executive function.

Socially, BAP is associated with greater loneliness and less satisfaction in social relationships. They may be socially awkward or shy. They usually have fewer friends or lower-quality friendships. They typically rate low for the personality trait of extraversion. In children, social play skills can develop more slowly than average. They may have pragmatic language impairments.

Emotionally, BAP is associated with higher levels of neuroticism, which leads to higher levels of anxiety, to greater struggles over stressful experiences, and to overall lower well-being. BAP is associated with a higher risk of depression, though whether this is a feature of BAP or primarily due to familial stress is unknown. Women with BAP are at higher risk of postpartum depression and other complications of pregnancy, and they are less likely to perceive or imagine an emotional bond with their newborn babies.

People with BAP usually display mild or slight impairments compared to people with a formal autism diagnosis. These tend to manifest as struggling with interpersonal relationships at home, at work, and at school. People with BAP have normal intelligence and do not have an elevated risk of epilepsy. They tend not to have significant cognitive impairments, and often have insight into their differences. Instead of seeming disabled or impaired, they may seem eccentric or quirky.

== Assessment ==
The broader autism phenotype is not a formal diagnostic label, but formal assessments are sometimes carried out to identify people for clinical trials on the genetic or biological basis of autism. Assessments usually involve questionnaires, such as the Social Responsiveness Scale, BAPQ, and BPASS forms. Interviews and direct observation are also used.

Alternatively, some relatives of autistic people connect their own traits or behaviors with their autistic relatives' characteristics. Identifying similarities can provide them with greater insight into their autistic relatives' needs.

== Relationship to autistic relatives ==
Mothers with BAP are more likely to have autistic children with lower language skills.

== Prevalence ==
The prevalence has been studied in first-, second-, and third-degree relatives of autistic people. (First-degree relatives, such as siblings, share 50% of their DNA, and third-degree relatives, such as first cousins, share 12.5% of their DNA.) Like ASD, BAP is more common in males than females.

BAP is more common among people who have a sibling on the autism spectrum than would be expected from chance alone. For example, one study found that 2% of people whose siblings had a non-autistic developmental delay (such as Down syndrome) had BAP, but up to 25% of people with autistic siblings had BAP. However, the prevalence can be less than half that if the study uses a "narrow" definition of BAP.

== Research directions ==
Current and future research is looking into the genetics of BAP and autism, as well as practical questions, such as whether children who have a parent or sibling on the autism spectrum benefit from early childhood intervention programs designed for children on the autism spectrum, whether BAP-affected parents need specific education or other support to help their children on the autism spectrum, and whether social skills training is helpful to people with BAP.

== See also ==
- Forme fruste – a milder or attenuated form of any medical condition
- Subsyndromal – collection of symptoms that is less than necessary for an official diagnosis
