= Developmental delay =

The term developmental delay can refer to:

- Global developmental delay, an umbrella term used when children are significantly delayed in two or more areas of development
- Specific developmental disorder, a classification of disorders characterized by delayed development
- Intellectual disability, generalized neurodevelopmental disorder characterized by significantly impaired intellectual and adaptive functioning
- Developmental disability, diverse group of chronic conditions, comprising mental or physical impairments that arise before adulthood
- Pervasive developmental disorder, a classification of disorders by delays in basic functions
