= Paul Shattuck =

American autism researcher

Paul T. Shattuck
- Education: University of Massachusetts, Amherst, Portland State University, University of Wisconsin–Madison
- Scientific career
- Fields: Autism
- Workplaces: Washington University in St. Louis, Drexel University
- Thesis: The prevalence of autism in special education (2005)

Paul T. Shattuck is an autism researcher at the A.J. Drexel Autism Institute at Drexel University, where he leads the Research Program Area on Life Course Outcomes. He was previously a faculty member at the George Warren Brown School of Social Work at Washington University in St. Louis.

== Education ==
Shattuck obtained his Ph.D. in social welfare and an M.S.W. from the University of Wisconsin–Madison in 2005, where he served as a postdoctoral fellow for two years thereafter. His education includes degrees in social work and sociology, and postdoctoral training in epidemiology.

== Career and research ==
While a postgraduate student at UWM, Shattuck worked on a study which concluded that some autistic children's behaviors, as they grow up, can improve with age. He is also well known for publishing a study in 2006 concluding that broadening of the diagnostic criteria has made a major contribution to the rise in autism rates, and for another study published three years later about the age at diagnosis of autistic children, which was later recognized as one of the most important autism studies of the year by both Autism Speaks and the Federal Interagency Autism Coordinating Committee. Another topic of Shattuck's research is whether autistic children attend college and/or get a job after they graduate from high school. In general, his research on this topic has concluded that a much higher percentage of autistic children are unemployed after high school than children with speech or language impairments or learning disabilities. One of his research papers, for example, concluded that only 53% of autistic children had ever held a paying job during the eight years following high school, the lowest rate among all disability groups. His most recent study is about the difficulties that autistic individuals will have transitioning into adulthood. His H-index is currently 54 with around 20k citations.
