= Laurence S. Baskin =

American academic

- Occupation: Professor
- Known for: Research on urinary bladder

Laurence S. Baskin is a professor of pediatrics and chief of pediatric urology at University of California, San Francisco (UCSF). His specialty is pediatric urologic reconstruction and the urologic care of patients with myelomeningocele.

== Research ==
The focus of his research is on development of the urinary bladder, including the role of cellular signaling, and on normal and abnormal genital development with respect to their possible endocrine origin.

== Publications ==
- Handbook of Pediatric Urology, Laurence S. Baskin and Barry A. Kogan, Editors (2005)
- Hypospadias and Genital Development, Volume 545 (2004)
