= CDH8 =

Protein-coding gene in humans

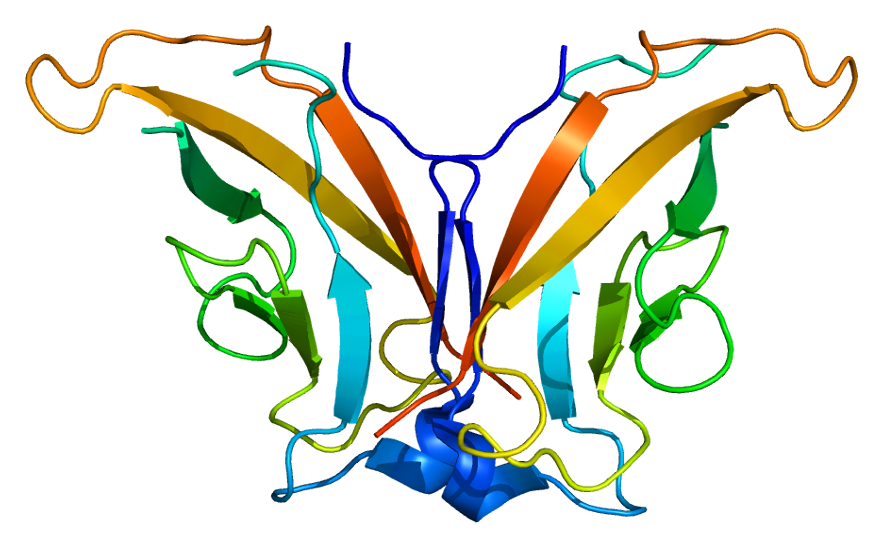

Identifiers
- Aliases: CDH8, Nbla04261, cadherin 8
- External IDs: OMIM: 603008; MGI: 107434; GeneCards: CDH8
Available structures
PDB	Ortholog search: PDBe RCSB
PDB	List of PDB id codes 1ZXK, 2A62

Gene location (Human)
Chr.	Chromosome 16 (human)
Band	16q21	Start	61,647,242 bp
Band	16q21	End	62,037,035 bp

Gene location (Mouse)
Chr.	Chromosome 8 (mouse)
Band	8 D1|8 49.4 cM	Start	99,751,103 bp
Band	8 D1|8 49.4 cM	End	100,143,103 bp
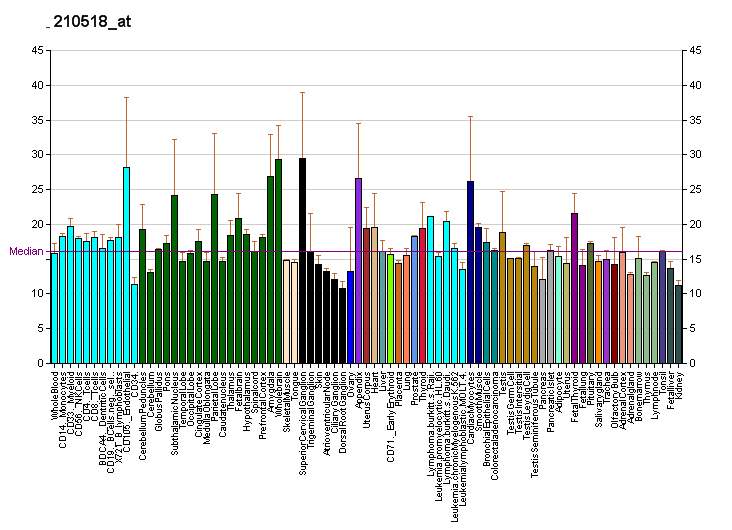
RNA expression pattern
Bgee	Human / Mouse (ortholog); Top expressed in: endothelial cell; Brodmann area 23; prefrontal cortex; lateral nuclear group of thalamus; entorhinal cortex; gonad; middle temporal gyrus; testicle; dorsolateral prefrontal cortex; Brodmann area 9 / Top expressed in: habenula; lateral septal nucleus; globus pallidus; dorsal tegmental nucleus; ventral tegmental area; medial dorsal nucleus; lateral hypothalamus; dentate gyrus of hippocampal formation granule cell; medial vestibular nucleus; lateral geniculate nucleus; More reference expression data
BioGPS	More reference expression data
Gene ontology
Molecular function	calcium ion binding; metal ion binding; identical protein binding; cytoskeletal protein binding; protein homodimerization activity; cadherin binding
Cellular component	axon terminus; integral component of membrane; synaptic cleft; membrane; plasma membrane; synaptic membrane; glutamatergic synapse; cell surface; catenin complex
Biological process	response to cold; cell adhesion; adherens junction organization; synaptic transmission, glutamatergic; homophilic cell adhesion via plasma membrane adhesion molecules; chemical synaptic transmission; regulation of synapse organization; cell-cell junction assembly; calcium-dependent cell-cell adhesion via plasma membrane cell adhesion molecules; cell-cell adhesion mediated by cadherin; cell-cell adhesion; cell morphogenesis
Sources:Amigo / QuickGO
Orthologs
Databases	NCBI: entry; OMA: entry
Species	Human	Mouse
Entrez	1006	12564
Ensembl	ENSG00000150394	ENSMUSG00000036510
UniProt	P55286	P97291
RefSeq (mRNA)	NM_001796	NM_001039154; NM_001285913; NM_001285914; NM_007667
RefSeq (protein)	NP_001787	NP_001034243; NP_001272842; NP_001272843; NP_031693
Location (UCSC)	Chr 16: 61.65 – 62.04 Mb	Chr 8: 99.75 – 100.14 Mb
PubMed search
- Wikidata
View/Edit Human	View/Edit Mouse

Cadherin-8 is a protein that in humans is encoded by the CDH8 gene.

== Function ==
This gene encodes a type II classical cadherin from the cadherin superfamily, integral membrane proteins that mediate calcium-dependent cell-cell adhesion. Mature cadherin proteins are composed of a large N-terminal extracellular domain, a single membrane-spanning domain, and a small, highly conserved C-terminal cytoplasmic domain. The extracellular domain consists of 5 subdomains, each containing a cadherin motif, and appears to determine the specificity of the protein's homophilic cell adhesion activity. Type II (atypical) cadherins are defined based on their lack of a HAV cell adhesion recognition sequence specific to type I cadherins. This particular cadherin is expressed in brain and is putatively involved in synaptic adhesion, axon outgrowth and guidance.

== Clinical significance ==
Disruptions of CDH8 in humans have been implicated in autism.
