= PCDHA12 =

Protein-coding gene in the species Homo sapiens

Identifiers
- Aliases: PCDHA12, PCDH-ALPHA12, protocadherin alpha 12
- External IDs: OMIM: 606318; MGI: 1298408; GeneCards: PCDHA12

Gene location (Human)
Chr.	Chromosome 5 (human)
Band	5q31.3	Start	140,875,302 bp
Band	5q31.3	End	141,012,347 bp

Gene location (Mouse)
Chr.	Chromosome 18 (mouse)
Band	18|18 B3	Start	37,138,256 bp
Band	18|18 B3	End	37,320,710 bp
RNA expression pattern
Bgee	Human / Mouse (ortholog); Top expressed in: testicle; cerebellum; cerebellar cortex; cerebellar hemisphere; islet of Langerhans; prefrontal cortex; ganglionic eminence; gallbladder; right hemisphere of cerebellum; superior frontal gyrus / Top expressed in: Ileal epithelium; CA3 field; choroid plexus of fourth ventricle; granular layer; soleus muscle; granular layer of dentate gyrus; Purkinje cell; dentate gyrus of hippocampal formation granule cell; tibialis anterior muscle; lactiferous gland; More reference expression data
BioGPS	n/a
Gene ontology
Molecular function	calcium ion binding
Cellular component	integral component of membrane; plasma membrane; membrane; integral component of plasma membrane
Biological process	homophilic cell adhesion via plasma membrane adhesion molecules; cell adhesion; cell-cell signaling; nervous system development
Sources:Amigo / QuickGO
Orthologs
Databases	NCBI: entry; OMA: entry
Species	Human	Mouse
Entrez	56137	12943
Ensembl	ENSG00000251664	ENSMUSG00000007440
UniProt	Q9UN75	Q91Y20
RefSeq (mRNA)	NM_031864; NM_018903	NM_009961
RefSeq (protein)	NP_061726; NP_114070	NP_034091
Location (UCSC)	Chr 5: 140.88 – 141.01 Mb	Chr 18: 37.14 – 37.32 Mb
PubMed search
- Wikidata
View/Edit Human	View/Edit Mouse

Protocadherin alpha-12 is a protein that in humans is encoded by the PCDHA12 gene.

This gene is a member of the protocadherin alpha gene cluster, one of three related gene clusters tandemly linked on chromosome 5 that demonstrate an unusual genomic organization similar to that of B-cell and T-cell receptor gene clusters. The alpha gene cluster is composed of 15 cadherin superfamily genes related to the mouse CNR genes and consists of 13 highly similar and 2 more distantly related coding sequences. The tandem array of 15 N-terminal exons, or variable exons, are followed by downstream C-terminal exons, or constant exons, which are shared by all genes in the cluster. The large, uninterrupted N-terminal exons each encode six cadherin ectodomains while the C-terminal exons encode the cytoplasmic domain. These neural cadherin-like cell adhesion proteins are integral plasma membrane proteins that most likely play a critical role in the establishment and function of specific cell-cell connections in the brain. Alternative splicing has been observed and additional variants have been suggested but their full-length nature has yet to be determined.
