= Mental health in New Zealand =

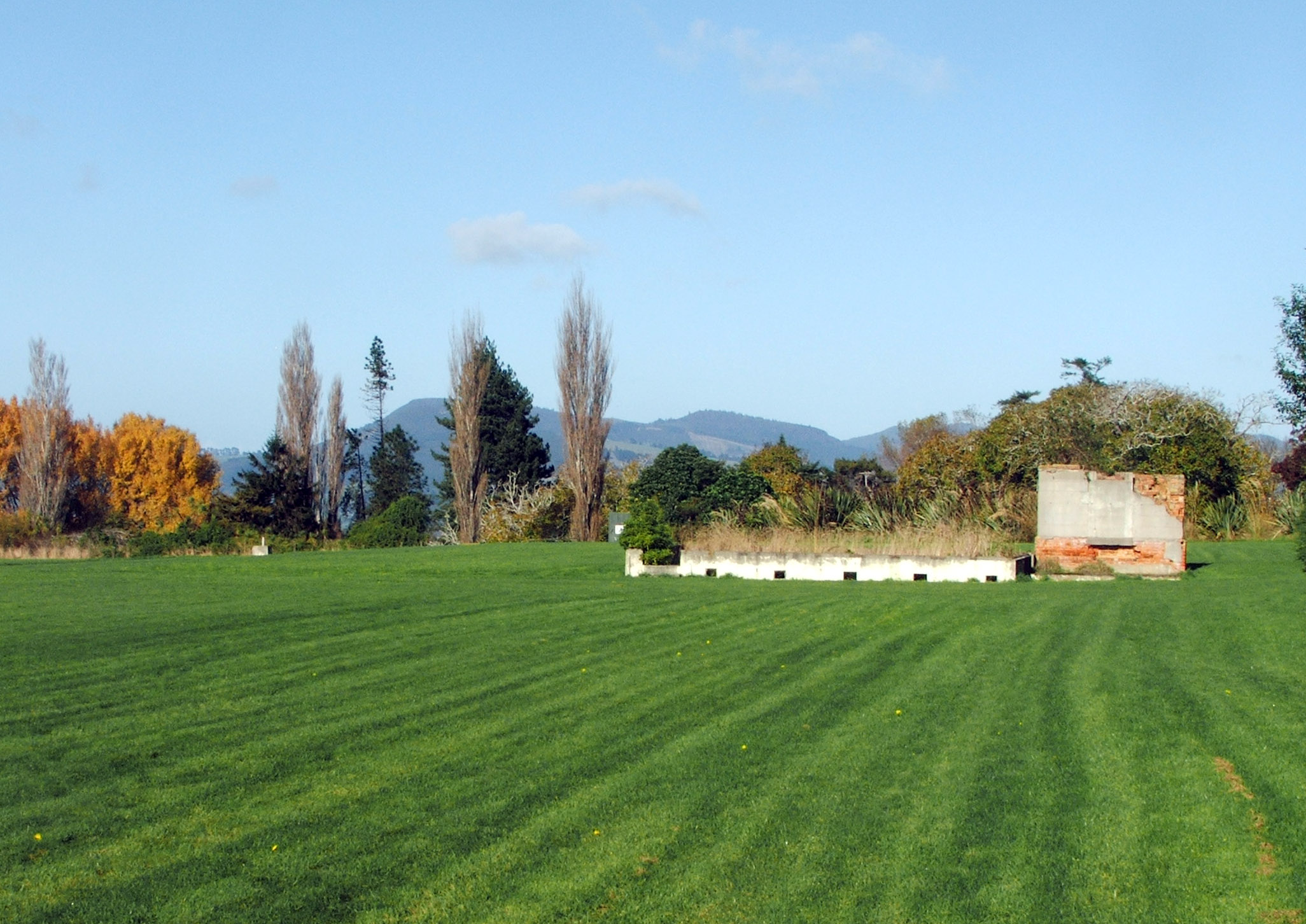
Site of an old asylum near Dunedin, now a public park after patients were shifted to a village and then the wider community.

Mental health in New Zealand generally follows the trends of mental health in other OECD countries. New Zealand's 'outdoor life style' and high standard of living are balanced by isolation and a self-reliant culture, which discourages asking for help. Historically, people with mental health problems were institutionalised, whereas now the focus is on care in the wider community. The stigma around poor mental health has been lessened in recent years as a result of this change and public education campaigns. However, New Zealand's minorities and youth continue to be over-represented in the negative mental health statistics.

== Definition of mental health ==
In New Zealand, mental health is considered the capacity to think and act in ways that increase your enjoyment of life and help you overcome challenges. This is similar to the Māori concept of holistic health, known as Hauora. Tangata whaiora (people seeking wellness) try to learn to incorporate their condition into their daily lives so that they have a full and satisfying life. The term wellbeing is currently included in the general census as an indicator of general mental health.

Negative conditions of mental health are divided into two groups based on how negatively they affect the sufferer's life. Mental health problems are unwanted behaviour that does not interrupt the routines of the individual's social life. A mental disorder (or illness) can be medically diagnosed by definition and more damaging effect on the sufferer's life. It includes hallucinations, delusions, violent behaviour, depression, addiction, anxiety or suicide attempts. Mental illnesses distinguish themselves from mental health problems by significantly adversely affecting the person's life.

== History of mental illness ==
Major historical psychiatric institutions in New Zealand.

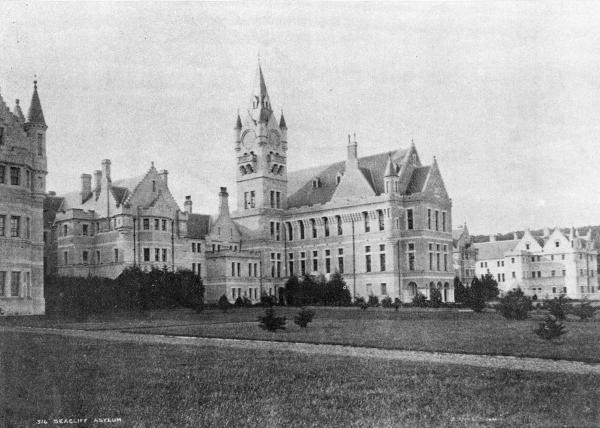
Seacliff Lunatic Asylum, built in the 1870s.

From the settlement of New Zealand (c. 1300 AD) till into the 20th century most Māori believed in a supernatural origin of mental illness. They did, however, distinguish between the insane, demented, the intellectually disabled, and people who were spiritually possessed. There is no significant reference to suicide in the Māori oral tradition.

Many European early settlers found life in the colony hard and alienating. Instances of depression were recorded and many attempts were made to make New Zealand more like their home country. In the 1840s, the societal response to people with mental illness was imprisonment in specially-built sections of local jails; no treatment was provided. However, two doctors were required to testify in order to commit a patient.

=== Asylums and mental hospitals ===
In the 1860s and 1870s, provincial governments opened asylums. Patient were given less restraint than before and encouraged to work and be involved in community activities. This system followed closely to the English model. The earliest of these institutions were small and near city centres, while later in the century they became immense hospitals built in secluded locations, such as Seacliff Lunatic Asylum. Some patients were admitted to these institutions for being difficult, confused, or because there was no other place for them.

The treatment patients received in these asylums was inconsistent and staff had no medical training. However, some innovators like Frederic Truby King in 1887 introduced better food for patients and more discipline for staff. The ward size was shrunk and patients given more freedom. Treatment, however, still remained cruel by modern standards.

In 1911, it became possible for people to admit themselves to asylums (now called Mental Hospitals) and patients were referred to as inmates instead of lunatics. This reduced some of the public stigma around mental illness. Separate parts of the hospitals were also reserved for diagnosis and early treatment. Hospitals were designed around multiple buildings so that patients of different age and sex could be more easily separated.

By 1916, halfway houses were being built to provide accommodation for veterans with 'shell shock' (post-traumatic stress disorder), which sometimes led to substance abuse. The public sympathy for these returned servicemen also helped improve the public image of mental illness. These halfway houses were also used for more minor mental health concerns and took some pressure off the mental hospital system. Psychiatry started to be practiced as a medical science and outpatient visits were also started. However, in the medical and public consciousness, there was still a division between people suffering from illness or bad experiences and the incurably insane.

In the 1930s, a number of medical procedures were introduced, including brain surgery, induced insulin coma, and electroconvulsive therapy. While once thought miraculous, they were discontinued due to negative side-effects and questionable health benefits. In the late 1930s, almost a quarter of patient admissions were voluntary. Treatment became free from 1939 in the now-renamed 'psychiatric hospitals.' Trial releases into society became more common but were still far from being the norm. In the 1940s, the roles of social worker and occupational therapist were introduced. Janet Frame, a famous New Zealand writer, was held at the asylum during the 1940s and was wrongly diagnosed as a schizophrenic. By 1969, a quarter of all mental patients were still in then-outdated asylum era buildings that lacked the design improvements from the previous 50 years. From the 1960s on, new hospitals epitomised the village-asylum atmosphere in name and design, contrasting with the old asylum model.

=== Treatment in the community ===
From the 1960s, patients were encouraged to take charge of their own care, ideally in the community. No extra beds were provided in psychiatric hospitals from 1973 on, and a push towards community care (outside of hospitals) was introduced. This was intended as a cost saving measure but was also due to the poor reputation of the hospital system. By the 1990s, almost all psychiatric hospitals were shut down, sometimes with the consent of their patients. The government still provided funding, but now through multiple agencies and charities. Patients were either transferred to remaining hospitals, or to residential care or supported accommodation in the community. People with intellectual disabilities moved to new lives in the community with care provided by a range of community agencies.

The 1990s also saw the separation of intellectual handicaps from mental health services, and more attention was paid to Māori, who were over-represented in the mental health system. From 2012 on, the Health and Disability Commission has overseen the integration of New Zealand's response to mental health issues. LGBT people have more mental health issues than the general population today in New Zealand. As in many countries, homosexual people were historically committed to mental institutions and given 'treatment' for what was believed to be a mental illness. About 4,000 people in New Zealand are committed to compulsory-detention on the grounds of a mental disorder every year.

From the 1980s on, there has also been attempts to reduce the stigma of sufferers of mental illness or at least draw attention to their situation. In 1981, the band Blam Blam Blam satirised New Zealand's optimistic self-image with the song 'There is no depression in New Zealand', which also mentions the use of the drug Valium. John Kirwan, a famous All Black, has openly spoken of his battle with depression and is actively involved in mental health and depression awareness campaigns in New Zealand. He has written about his depression in the books All Blacks Don't Cry and Stand by Me. There are guidelines for the media when dealing with mental health issues.

=== Government apologies and accountability for historical institutional abuse ===
In recent years, the New Zealand Government has issued several formal apologies for historical injustices related to institutional care within the Nation. New Zealand's current Prime Minister, Christopher Luxon, made a “formal and unreserved” apology in Parliament in 2024 regarding the widespread torture, neglect, and abuse of hundreds of thousands of children and vulnerable adults in care, many of them indigenous Maori. It was estimated that 200,000 people in either state, foster or faith-based care, endured inhumane abuse over seven decades. During that time period, between 1950 and 2019, approximately 650,000 were in care, which results in nearly one-third of the total suffering “unimaginable” abuse. Furthermore, this investigation was recognized as the largest ever undertaken in New Zealand due to its combined 6-year scale, multi-sector scope, extensive hearings, survivor statements, reviewed documents, and its significant cost and impact, which spanned billions to compensate and reform future care.

Another notable apology was in 2001, when the government paid out NZ$10 million in compensation to 183 former Lake Alice patients. The former head of the unit, Selwyn Leeks, was later found to have engaged in misconduct, but he was never formally charged due to ill health and passed away a month later, meaning no one was or has been held criminally accountable. Some survivors have described the government's acknowledgment as symbolic rather than a genuine apology, referring to it as a “small brick in a stepping stone” after experiencing repeated electric shocks. During the 1970s, Leeks justified the use of electric shock treatment, stating that “it’s effective, it’s quick, it’s lifesaving, it has much to recommend it.” These treatments are now formally recognized by the government as constituting torture.

These apologies have typically acknowledged systemic neglect and abuse that occurred in psychiatric institutions, children's homes, and hospitals throughout the mid-20th century. The government's approach has focused on processes of official recognition and compensation, aiming to restore trust between state institutions and affected communities.

== Conditions, causes, and treatment of illness ==
All mental health problems can occur in ways that have only minor effects on daily life. However, diagnosable mental illnesses include depression, bipolar disorder, anxiety, obsessive compulsive disorder, eating disorders, post-traumatic stress disorder and schizophrenia. Obsessive compulsive and eating disorders can have similar symptoms and causes. Post-traumatic stress disorder does not have to have a wartime cause; however, a new generation of military sufferers are present from the war on terror.

== Effects on the individual, family, and society ==
The effects of poor mental health range from lost work hours to suicide and damage the whole community. New Zealanders who are sentenced to prison have a three times higher rate of mental illness than the rest of the population. In 2015 62% of inmates stated they had a mental health or substance abuse problem in the last year. People who have experienced mental illness may be treated unfairly in the workforce.

=== Youth suicide ===
While New Zealand's suicide rate is comparable with similar countries, the youth suicide rate is much higher. Before the mid-1980s, the suicide rate increased with age, however, after this time the pattern has reversed. By the mid-1990s, people aged 15–34 had suicide rates of over 25 per 100,000, while rates for those over 45 years old fell to 13 per 100,000. This fell to the still unusually high 16.9 per 100,000 in 2015. Many reasons contribute to New Zealand's high youth suicide rate, including child poverty, high rates of teenage pregnancies, or family unemployment. New Zealand also has a record of high rates of bullying in school. It has also been argued that as economic inequality in New Zealand has grown, there has been a dramatic increase in the youth suicide rate.

== Current treatment landscape and continuing challenges ==
As of 2025, New Zealand maintains a limited number of publicly funded specialist beds for mental health inpatient treatment, relative to demand. In major cities, inpatient wait times can extend from several weeks to several months. A strong case to exemplify the current landscape is in the realm of eating disorder treatment, a mental illness with the highest mortality rate globally. The Ministry of Health estimates that 1,800 to 2,000 people access publicly funded eating disorders services each year, with referrals exponentially increasing. Of those, roughly three-quarters of New Zealanders require hospitalisation for eating disorder-related complications, yet access to specialist facilities remains constrained due to limited availability.

Studies indicate that extended inpatient treatment significantly improves outcomes for people with eating disorders. A prospective multi-centre study, Factors influencing the length of hospital stay of patients with anorexia nervosa - results of a prospective multi‑center study, found an average length of stay of 11.8 weeks (~83 days) for adult female inpatients with anorexia nervosa. While there is no official New Zealand-specific median reported, the Organisation for Economic Co‑operation and Development (OECD) data on hospital stays for “mental and behavioural disorders” shows wide variation across countries especially when limited facilities are a constraining factor.

According to the recently updated Eating Issues and Eating Disorders Strategy remained untouched for the previous 16 years, an estimated 400,000 New Zealanders (about 7.5% of the population) will experience an eating disorder during their lifetime. The strategy highlights persistent underinvestment, with total funding for eating disorder services representing less than 1% of the national mental health budget, equivalent to roughly NZ$305,000 per 100,000 population; this is well below comparable levels in Australia and the UK, which are $577,000 and $533,000 per 100,000 population, respectively. Access also remains unequal, with Māori and rural communities facing higher prevalence and lower service availability.

=== Mental Health Infrastructure Programme (MHIP) ===
In recent years, beyond the updated Eating Issues and Eating Disorders Strategy, Aotearoa New Zealand has undertaken significant efforts to modernise its mental health infrastructure and address longstanding capacity gaps across the public system.

Central to this transformation is the Mental Health Infrastructure Programme (MHIP), a nationwide initiative led by the Infrastructure and Investment Group within Te Whatu Ora, Health New Zealand

The MHIP coordinates 16 scale mental health and addiction projects nationwide, with a combined public investment of approximately NZ$997.3 million. The programme's design framework is guided by Australasian Health Facility Guidelines and complemented by a uniquely Aotearoa-specific Design Guidance Note that incorporates kaupapa Māori (Māori philosophical and cultural principles) into the built environment. Facilities are designed to include ātea (open, welcoming spaces), wharenui (meeting houses), and wharekai (communal dining areas). The reasoning behind these areas is to enable manākitanga (care and hospitality), pōwhiri (welcoming ceremonies), and whakatau (settling or reception processes) for patients and their whānau (families). These culturally informed features aim to foster a sense of belonging, dignity, and emotional safety, reflecting both clinical best practices and the relational aspects of Māori health traditions.

Among the 16 national projects, three major facilities have been completed to date:

1. Manawai Individualised Service Units at the Rātonga-Rua-o-Porirua Mental Health Campus in Wellington,
2. The Tiaho Mai Mental Health Inpatient Unit at Middlemore Hospital in South Auckland, and
3. Buildings 12 and 14 at Hillmorton Hospital in Christchurch (Waitaha Canterbury).

=== Health New Zealand Waitaha Canterbury: Hillmorton Hospital Redevelopment ===
Completed in 2023, the NZ$81.8 million redevelopment of Hillmorton Hospital represents one of the most advanced projects within the MHIP. The redevelopment replaced outdated infrastructure and consolidated several specialist services previously located at Princess Margaret Hospital. The new facilities include:

- A 16-bed Adult Inpatient Unit providing extended mental health care, and
- A 29-bed integrated facility that houses the South Island Eating Disorders Service (SIEDS), the Mothers and Babies Service, and the Child, Adolescent and Family Unit.

The redevelopment was co-designed with iwi (Māori tribal groups), clinicians, and individuals with lived experience of mental illness to ensure cultural safety and a welcoming environment. Each individual receiving inpatient treatment has a private room, and the building incorporates communal lounges, outdoor courtyards, a classroom for young patients, and a clean-energy centre that supports carbon-neutral public service goals.

The facilities comply with the Ngā Paerewa Health and Disability Services Standards (NZS 8134:2021) and align with the national Zero Seclusion Project, which promotes the elimination of seclusion and the adoption of trauma-informed, person-centred care.

=== Counties Manukau: Tiaho Mai Mental Health Inpatient Unit ===
At the northern end of the MHIP network, the Tiaho Mai Mental Health Inpatient Unit at Middlemore Hospital provides 24-hour residential care for adults experiencing acute or complex mental health challenges. The name Tiaho Mai translates to “the light that comes from the moon and the stars”, symbolising hope, healing, and guidance.

The facility comprises three wards: Manaaki Tangata (caring for people), Whai Oranga (pursuing wellbeing), and Ki Te Whai Ao (toward the light), offering both intensive and open care settings. Further, “Tiaho Mai was built to accommodate up to 76 inpatient beds across both high and low-dependency spaces.”

== Private sector: Recovered Living New Zealand (RLNZ) ==
RLNZ, based in North Canterbury, is the country's only private residential centre dedicated solely to eating disorder recovery. Operating under Accident Compensation Corporation (ACC) approval, RLNZ offers residential, day, and virtual outpatient programmes. Average residential stays last three to five months, with 2025 fees around NZ$7,350 per week. While the centre draws on evidence-based international models demonstrating significant symptom improvement, high costs restrict access to self-funded or insured patients.

== See also ==
- Hauora
- Ministry of Health (New Zealand)
- Healthcare in New Zealand
- Mental health in the United Kingdom
- Rights of mental health patients in New Zealand
