= NHS Constitution for England =

Document from England's National Health Service

The NHS Constitution for England is a document that sets out objectives of the National Health Service, rights and responsibilities of the various parties involved in health care, (staff, trust board, patients' rights and responsibilities) and the guiding principles which govern the service. Unlike a real constitution, the document is not itself legally enforceable, though it purports to set out the rights of patients and staff.

First published on 21 January 2009, it was one of a number of recommendations in Lord Darzi’s report "High Quality Care for All" as part of a ten-year plan to provide the highest quality of care and service for patients in England. Previously, these rights and responsibilities had evolved in common law or through English or EU law, or were policy pledges by the NHS and UK government that have been written into the document. It can be seen as a development of the ideas that began with the introduction of the Patient's Charter in 1991. It is fairly brief and written in plain terms. Accompanying is a handbook which gives more information to patients and staff about the document, and also provides detail on the legislation that underpins the rights. A statement of NHS accountability also gives a clear account of the NHS system of accountability, transparency and responsibility.

The constitution was updated in 2013.
