= Secondary malignant neoplasm =

- Specialty: Oncology

Secondary malignant neoplasm is a malignant tumor whose cause is the treatment (usually radiation or chemotherapy) which was used for a prior tumor. It must be distinguished from metastasis from the prior tumor or a relapse from it since a secondary malignant neoplasm is a different tumor.
