= Patients' rights =

Set of principles to protect the interest of those receiving medical care

Patients' rights consist of enforceable duties that healthcare professionals and healthcare business persons owe to patients to provide them with certain services or benefits. When such services or benefits become rights instead of simply privileges, then a patient can expect to receive them and can expect the support of people who enforce organization policies or legal codes to intervene on the patient's behalf if the patient does not receive them. A patient's bill of rights is a list of guarantees for those receiving medical care. It may take the form of a law or a non-binding declaration. Typically a patient's bill of rights guarantees patients information, fair treatment, and autonomy over medical decisions, among other rights.

== India ==
Under the direction of the Ministry of Health and Family Welfare (MOHFW), India's National Human Rights Commission drafted a Charter of Patients' Rights in 2018. Following a recommendation by the National Council of Clinical Establishments, MOHFW submitted the draft in the public domain for comments and suggestions in August 2018.

The Charter draws upon different provisions relevant to patients' rights that were previously scattered across the Constitution of India, the Drugs and Cosmetic Act of 1940, the Clinical Establishment Act of 2010, and various judgments by the Supreme Court of India, among other sources. The Charter aims to:

1. provide a reference for State Governments to enact or modify existing regulation.
2. provide a framework of healthcare standards for service providers.
3. And, raise awareness among patients about their rights.

=== Recognized patients' rights ===
The Charter of Patients' Rights lists seventeen rights that patients are entitled to:

- Right to information: Every patient has the right to know what is the illness that they are suffering, its causes, the status of the diagnosis (provisional or confirmed), expected costs of treatment. Furthermore, service providers should communicate this in a manner that is understandable for the patient.
- Right to records and reports: The patient has the right to access his/her medical records and investigation reports. Service providers should make these available upon the patients' payment of any photocopy fees as applicable.
- Right to emergency care: Public and private hospitals have an obligation to provide emergency medical care regardless of the patients' capacity to pay for the services.
- Right to informed consent: Patients have the right to be asked for their informed consent before submitting to potentially hazardous treatment. Physicians should clearly explain the risks from receiving the treatment and only administer the treatment after getting explicit written consent from the patient.
- Right to confidentiality, human dignity and privacy: Doctors should observe strict confidentiality of a patient's condition, with the only exception of potential threats to public health. In case of a physical inspection by a male doctor on a female patient, the latter has the right to have a female person present throughout the procedure. Hospitals also have an obligation to secure patient information from any external threats.
- Right to second opinion: Patients are entitled to seek a second opinion and hospitals should facilitate any information or records that the patient requires to do so.
- Right to transparency in rates, and care according to prescribed rates wherever relevant: Hospitals should display the rates that they charge in a visible manner and patients should receive an itemized bill when payment is required. Essential medicines, devices and implants should comply with rates established by the National Pharmaceutical Pricing Authority (NPPA).
- Right to non-discrimination: Service providers cannot deny treatment on the basis of gender, caste, religion, age, sexual orientation or social origins. Additionally, it is against the Charter to deny treatment on the basis of a patients' health condition, including HIV status.
- Right to safety and quality care according to standards: Hospitals must ensure a hygienic and sanitized environment to provide their services.
- Right to choose alternative treatment options if available: Patients have the right to consider treatment alternatives and even refuse treatment.
- Right to choose source for obtaining medicines or tests: Any registered pharmacy and laboratory is eligible to provide patients with goods and services they require.
- Right to proper referral and transfer, which is free from perverse commercial influences: In case of transfers or referrals, the patient has the right to an explanation that justifies the transfer, as well as confirmation from the hospital receiving the patient about their acceptance of the transfer.
- Right to protection for patients involved in clinical trials: Clinical trials should comply with all the standards and protocols under the Directorate General of Health Services.
- Right to protection of participants involved in biomedical and health research: Studies involving patients should follow the National Ethical Guidelines for Biomedical and Health Research Involving Human Participants.
- Right to take discharge of patient, or receive body of deceased from hospital: Patients have the right to be discharged and may not be detained at a health service provider facility because of procedural reasons such as payment disputes.
- Right to Patient Education: In addition to information about their condition, patients have the right to know about public health services such as insurance schemes and charitable hospitals.
- Right to be heard and seek redressal: feedback and comments to their health service providers and file complaints as required. They additionally have the right to redressal in cases where any of their rights are violated.

== Morocco ==
Morocco has expressed its interest in recognizing the right to health for the entire population, a right rooted in the Islamic religion.

== United Kingdom ==
In the UK, the Patient's Charter was introduced and revised in the 1990s. It was replaced by the NHS Constitution for England in 2013.

== United States ==
In the United States there have been a number of attempts to enshrine a patient's bill of rights in law, including a bill rejected by Congress in 2001.

=== Bill of 2001 ===
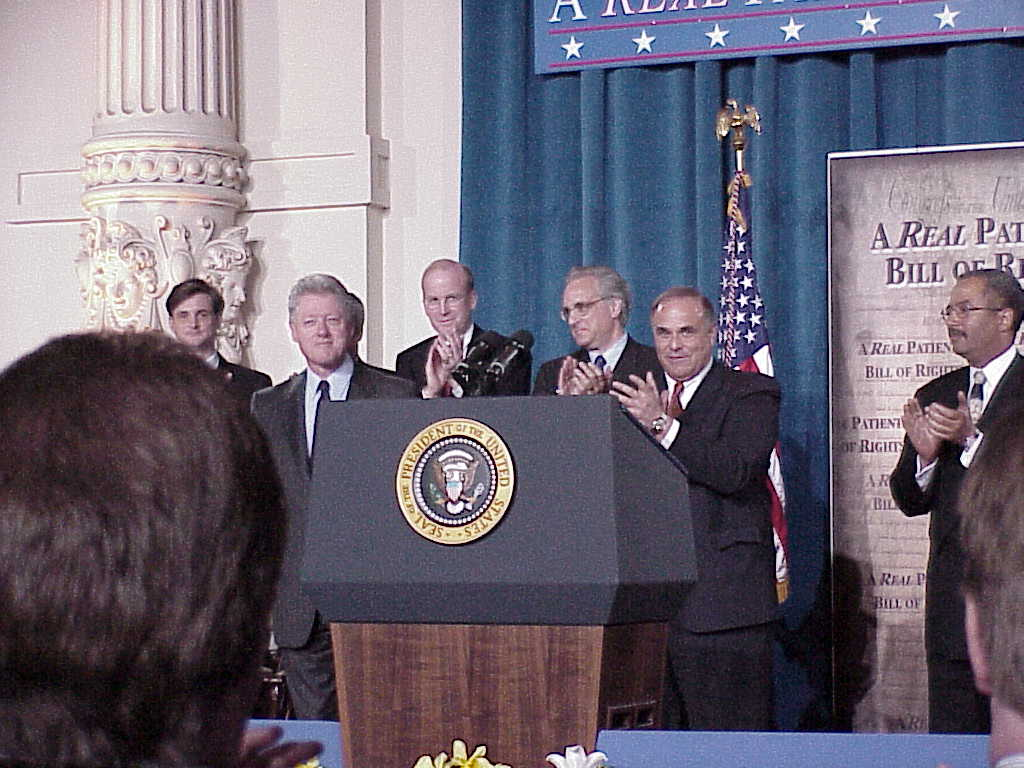
A rally for the patients' bill of rights proposed in 2001, with Bill Clinton, Joe Hoeffel, Ron Klink, Ed Rendell, and Chaka Fattah

The United States Congress considered a bill designed to safeguard patients' rights in 2001. The "Bipartisan Patient Protection Act" (S.1052), sponsored by Senators Ted Kennedy and John McCain, contained new rules for what health maintenance organizations had to cover and granted new rights for patients to sue in state or federal courts, if they are denied needed care.

The House of Representatives and Senate passed differing versions of the proposed law. Although both bills would have provided patients key rights, such as prompt access to emergency care and medical specialists, only the Senate-passed measure would provide patients with adequate means to enforce their rights. The Senate's proposal would have conferred a broad array of rights on patients. It would have ensured that patients with health care plans had the right to:

- have their medical decisions made by a doctor;
- see a medical specialist;
- go to the closest emergency room;

The bill was passed by the US Senate by a vote of 59–36 in 2001, it was then amended by the House of Representatives and returned to the Senate. Reportedly, President Bush threatened to veto the bill if it included the Senate's provision to allow patients to sue managed care organizations in the state and federal courts.

=== Industry resistance ===
Wendell Potter, former senior executive at Cigna-turned-whistleblower, has written that the insurance industry worked to kill "any reform that might interfere with insurers' ability to increase profits" by engaging in extensive and well-funded anti-reform campaigns. The industry, he says, "goes to great lengths to keep its involvement in these campaigns hidden from public view," including the use of "front groups".

== The ethical responsibility of health professionals to respect patients' rights ==
By highlighting the ethical responsibility of health care professionals towards their patients, basic principles are mentioned, such as self-esteem, prevention of harm, promotion of well-being and justice. These principles play an essential role in guiding medical decisions, helping healthcare providers care for the well-being of patients while maintaining their decision-making capacity, thus achieving a fundamental balance between medical ethics and the commitment of health professionals to patients

== See also ==
- Health care reform in the United States
- Human experimentation in the United States
- Disability rights
- Pregnant patients' rights
- Patient safety
- Second opinion
- Medical ethics
- Mental Health Systems Act of 1980 — Earlier U.S. patients' rights legislation.
- Rights of mental health patients in New Zealand
- Right to health
