= Patient's Charter =

The Patients' Charter is an official document by the government or an organization that enlists various Patients' Rights and Responsibility along with the Code of Practice, followed by a medical personnel.

The Patient's Charter was first started out as a United Kingdom government official document, which sets out a number of Patient's rights for National Health Service patients inspiring other nations to publish their patients' charter as well. It was originally introduced in 1991, under the then Conservative government, and was revised in 1995 and 1997. The charter set out rights in service areas including general practice, hospital treatment, community treatment, ambulance, dental, optical, pharmaceutical and maternity care.

Various stakeholders have criticised the charter for reasons widely ranging from not offering sufficient support to transgender patients to increasing attacks on hospital staff. The Patient's Charter was supplemented by the NHS Plan 2000 and subsequently replaced by the NHS Constitution for England in 2013.

== United Kingdom ==
=== Scotland ===
The Patient Rights (Scotland) Act 2011 was passed by the Scottish Parliament on 24 February 2011, and received Royal Assent on 31 March 2011. The charter was first published in October 2012.

== India ==
Under the direction of the Ministry of Health and Family Welfare (MOHFW), India's National Human Rights Commission drafted a Charter of Patients' Rights in 2018 which can be found at NABH website here.
