= Oncological emergencies =

Potentially life-threatening cancer-related conditions

Oncological emergencies are a group of conditions that occur as a direct or indirect result of cancer or its treatment that are potentially life-threatening

These include:

- Hypercalcaemia
- Neutropaenic sepsis
- Tumour lysis syndrome
- Leukostasis
- Raised intracranial pressure
- Spinal cord compression
- Cauda equina syndrome
- Superior vena cava obstruction
- Syndrome of inappropriate antidiuretic hormone secretion (SIADH)
- Disseminated intravascular coagulation
