= Hauora =

Māori philosophy of health

Diagram of a whare, named with domains of Hauora.

Hauora is a Māori philosophy of health and well-being unique to New Zealand.

There are four dimensions of hauora: taha tinana (physical well-being – health), taha hinengaro (mental and emotional well-being – self-confidence), taha whanau (social well-being – self-esteem) and taha wairua (spiritual well-being – personal beliefs).

The Whare Tapa Wha model represents aspects of Hauora as the four walls of a whare, each wall representing a different dimension. All four dimensions are necessary for strength and stability.

Other models of hauora have been designed. For example, in 1997, Lewis Moeau, iwi leader and later cultural advisor for the Prime Minister suggested that a fifth dimension, whenua (connection with the land), be added to the original model. In 2001, Hokowhitu also tried to have whenua added to the Tapawha model but again it was not added.
