= Rights of mental health patients in New Zealand =

The rights of mental health patients in New Zealand are covered in law by both the New Zealand Bill of Rights Act 1990 and The Code of Health and Disability Service Consumers' Rights. Section 11 of the Bill of Rights Act states that "everyone has the right to refuse to undergo any medical treatment". However the Mental Health (Compulsory Treatment and Assessment) Act 1992 allows for the compulsory treatment of patients with major mental illness who do not consent. This legislation also allows for the detention and treatment of individuals who have committed crimes but who have either been deemed unfit to plead or have been found not guilty by reason of insanity.

== Medical treatment and the Bill of Rights Act ==
Section 11 of the Bill of Rights Act states "everyone has the right to refuse to undergo any medical treatment." However, many mental health patients are treated compulsorily under the Mental Health (Compulsory Treatment and Assessment) Act. Sections 4, 5, and 6 of the NZBORA allow for reasonable limitations on the rights laid out by the act. Section 6 states:

"Wherever an enactment can be given a meaning that is consistent with the rights and freedoms contained in this Bill of Rights, that meaning shall be preferred to any other meaning."

The word "everyone" in s11 has been interpreted to mean "every person who is competent to consent". Competence plays an important role in the decision making of clinical staff when seeking to treat patients compulsorily.

=== Re M case ===
Previous mental health legislation, the Mental Health Act 1969, was challenged in relation to the NZBORA in 1991 in the case of Re M. In June 1984, M was detained by mental health services after disclosing that he intended to kill a woman whom he had become obsessed with and then commit suicide. Clinical staff concluded that his obsession was of delusional intensity and that his risk to himself and others was significant enough to detain him under s24 of the Mental Health Act 1969. The High Court of New Zealand considered whether the man's detention was, under the Bill of Rights Act 1990, "arbitrary". It was held that refusing to release M was not arbitrary, based on evidence that he was mentally disordered, and that he posed a risk to both the public and himself. This interpretation follows in relation to the current Act.

== The Code of Health and Disability Service Consumers' Rights ==
The Code of Health and Disability Service Consumers' Rights came into force in 1996. It is subordinate legislation, authorised by the Health and Disability Commissioner Act 1994. Section 20(1) of the Health and Disability Commissioner Act lays out the matters which the Code should cover. This includes the principle that, with exceptions for enactments or provisions within the Code, no health care procedure shall be carried out without informed consent, the duties and obligations of health care providers, and the rights of consumers.

=== Rights under the code ===
1. Right to be Treated with Respect
2. Right to Freedom from Discrimination, Coercion, Harassment and Exploitation
3. Right to Dignity and Independence
4. Right to Service of an Appropriate Standard
5. Right to Effective Communication
6. Right to be Fully Informed
7. Right to Make an Informed Choice and Give Informed Consent
8. Right to Support
9. Rights in respect of Teaching and Research
10. Right to Complain.

Whilst the Code was introduced after the Mental Health (Compulsory Treatment and Assessment) Act, the two are not in conflict. As stated in Clause 5, "Nothing in [the] Code shall require a provider to act in breach of any legal obligation or duty imposed by any other enactment or prevent a provider from doing an act authorised by any other enactment". According to Sylvia Bell,

"The real value of the code in a psychiatric context is that it affirms the duty of providers to ensure that clinical processes are exercised in a professional manner, and proper deference is paid by clinicians and mental health workers to the human rights of patients".

== Mental Health (Compulsory Treatment and Assessment) Act 1992 ==
According to John Dawson,

"The new Act is a compromise between competing demands - for rapid access to treatment in genuine emergencies, for greater respect for patients' dignity, for adherence to fairer procedures in mental health proceedings, and for the continued protection of families and the public from genuinely 'dangerous' people."

Patients can be compulsorily treated for mental illness under the Act. Part 1 allows for the compulsory assessment and treatment of a patient. Section 8 states that any person may apply to the Director of Area Mental Health Services (DAHMS) for the assessment of someone believed to be experiencing mental illness. Section 8B states that this application must be accompanied by a certificate from a medical professional who believes the person has a mental disorder. An assessment will then be arranged under the provisions of s9 of the Act. If the patient is found to be "mentally disordered" during this preliminary assessment, they will have to continue with follow up for up to a total of 19 days. Following this period, the responsible clinician may apply to the Family Court for a Compulsory Treatment Order under s28 of the Act. These may either be a community treatment order (s29) or an inpatient order (s30).

=== Definition of mental disorder ===
Mental disorder is defined in section 2 of the Act. It is defined as:

"an. . . abnormal state of mind (whether of a continuous or an intermittent nature), characterised by delusions, or by disorders of mood or perception or volition or cognition, of such a degree that it -

"(a) Poses a serious danger to the health or safety of that person or of others; or

"(b) Seriously diminishes the capacity of that person to take care of himself or herself."

Mental disorder is not a clinical diagnosis but rather a legal definition. Finding of mental disorder requires the establishment of four elements:

1. an abnormal state of mind;
2. whether the abnormal state of mind is of a continuous or intermittent natures;
3. whether the abnormal state of mind is characterised by delusions or disorders of mood, perception, volition or cognition;
4. the degree of seriousness that represents a danger to self or others or seriously diminishes capacity for self care.

Difficulty arises around compulsory treatment, as, while the definition of mental disorder is a legal one, not a medical one, decisions around detaining a patient or enforcing compulsory treatment are made by clinical staff. When a clinician is deciding whether or not to treat someone without their consent, their application of the requirements to treat someone compulsorily may vary from their colleagues'. Stephanie du Fresne argues

"Some clinicians want to see evidence of the psychopathology mentioned in the definition of mental disorder before they conclude mental disorder is present. Others accept that the reference to 'intermittent' psychopathology is not present at the s10 assessment but is persuasively described in recent clinical assessments by others".

==== Abnormal state of mind ====
Whilst section 2 is unclear as to what constitutes an "abnormal state of mind", the courts have found that this is a legal term that "measure the patient's mental state with reference to what is perceived as normal by the community". This definition allows for conditions that may be classified as a mental disorder by the medical profession (such as sexual dysfunction) to avoid legal definition that would allow those with such a condition to be subject to compulsory treatment under the Mental Health Act.

==== Continuous or intermittent ====
Remission of mental illness does not necessarily mean that an individual is no longer mentally disordered. The inclusion of the word "intermittent" gives clinicians scope to ensure patient compliance with treatment where treatment has caused remission and ceasing treatment would lead to a resurgence of illness.

=== Part 6 of the Act ===
Part 6 of the MHA lays out the rights of patients receiving mental health care. These rights are:

1. General right to information
2. Respect of cultural identity
3. Right to treatment
4. Right to be informed about treatment
5. Further rights in case of visual or audio recording
6. Right to independent psychiatric advice
7. Right to legal advice
8. Right to company, and seclusion
9. Right to receive visitors and make phone calls
10. Right to receive letters and postal articles
11. Right to send letters and postal articles
12. Right to complain when rights are breached

Whilst a number of these rights were included in the previous Mental Health Act (1969), others are new to statute. However, some, such as the right to receive visitors and make phone calls, were considered fundamental, and it was seen as unnecessary to include them in statute. Section 64 of the Act states that a person has to receive a statement of their rights under the Act in writing at the commencement of treatment. However, in practice it may not always be appropriate to give this information to patients if they are acutely unwell. These rights are contextual. Patients have these rights because of their status as a psychiatric inpatient.

==== Informed consent ====
For the treatment of mental health, capacity to consent is not judged by the person's mental health status (i.e. if they have been diagnosed with a mental illness) but in relation to the significance of the decision to be made. Patients may be capable of consenting to (or refusing) some procedures but not others.

== Special patients ==
A special patient is someone who has entered the mental health system through the criminal justice system. They are individuals who have been found unfit to plead, acquitted on account of insanity, or have been committed to a hospital or facility on conviction. Special patients are subject to far greater controls in regards to re-classification and discharge decisions, whilst patients may simply be discharged from hospital directly from hospital by clinicians. The discharge of a special patient is decided not based on the patient's clinical responsiveness but rather based on the overriding concerns for the safety of the public.

== See also ==
- Mental health in New Zealand
