= Angiopellosis =

Movement of cells out of the circulatory system into surrounding tissue

In cellular biology, angiopellosis (cell extravasation) is the movement of cells out of the circulatory system, into the surrounding tissue. This process is specific to non-leukocytic cells; white blood cells (leukocytes) employ diapedesis for movement out of circulation. Angiopellosis was discovered by studying the way that stem cells reach damaged tissue when injected or infused into the circulatory system. It has been found that circulating tumor cells (CTCs) possess this ability to exit blood vessels through angiopellosis during the process of metastasis.

Angiopellosis involves cell–cell recognition by the blood vessel wall (endothelial cells), and the active remodeling of the blood vessel to allow the cell to exit.

== Mechanism ==
Angiopellosis extravasation occurs as a means for cells that are not native to the circulation to exit. This includes adult stem cells that are injected intravenously for therapies. Cells that are normally found in circulation (i.e. blood cells) either extravasate through diapedesis (white blood cells), or do not extravasate and remain in circulation (red blood cells).

Angiopellosis was first observed by researchers studying the mechanism by which intravenously injected stem cells arrived at damaged tissue. They discovered that the injected stem cells prompted the blood vessel walls to undergo extensive changes at the cellular level, resulting in the removal of the cell from within the vessel (lumen) into the surrounding tissue.

Below is a brief summary of each of the steps currently thought to be involved in angiopellosis:

Upon entering the circulation, the cell (or clump of cells) travels through the circulatory system and eventually attaches to or becomes lodged within the blood vessel wall. This prompts a series of events that ends with the cell exiting circulation:

1. The endothelial cells of the vessel recognize the cell through membrane-specific recognition. Recognition of the cell is vital, and is thought to be what prevents cells native to the circulation from randomly extravasating via angiopellosis.
2. Once attached or lodged, the exiting cell(s) elicit activity from the endothelial cells of the blood vessel: the endothelial cells extend protrusions and actively remodel themselves around the exiting cells.
3. The exiting cell will then be either actively "pushed" from the inside of the blood vessel, or the vascular cells will remodel around the cell so that the cell no longer remains inside the vessel.

== Differences from Leukocyte Extravasation ==
The most notable difference is the physical mechanism the cells use to exit. During angiopellosis, the endothelial cells are the most active in the process, while in diapedesis it is the white blood cell that are the most physically active during the process.

During angiopellosis the extravasating cell remains round in morphology and only slightly changes shape as a result of the vasculature remodeling around it; during diapedesis, the white blood cells significantly change shape as they squeeze between the cells of the blood vessel wall.

Angiopellosis allows for the extravasation of multiple cells during a single event. The blood vessel will actively remodel around a cluster/group of cells and allow the cells to exit in a single event. Diapedesis only allows for a single white blood cell to migrate across the blood vessel wall at a given time. Although multiple white blood cells can leave simultaneously, they all elicit separate diapedesis extravasation events.

There are further temporal and molecular difference between the two processes.

== Role in the Cancer Exodus Hypothesis ==
Angiopellosis is a critical component of the Cancer Exodus Hypothesis, which posits that circulating tumor cells (CTCs) can extravasate as multicellular clusters rather than only as single cells. According to this hypothesis, CTC clusters maintain their cohesive structure throughout the process of metastasis, which enhances their metastatic potential.

This hypothesis challenges traditional views that CTC clusters must dissociate to initiate metastasis. Studies show that these clusters are capable of exiting blood vessels through angiopellosis while maintaining their multicellular configuration, thus enhancing their ability to establish secondary tumors. This cluster-based migration and extravasation may contribute to the increased treatment resistance observed in metastases, as CTC clusters can harbor a greater diversity of cell types than single CTCs.

The Cancer Exodus Hypothesis underscores the importance of CTC clusters as biomarkers in liquid biopsy techniques, as their presence can be indicative of advanced metastatic disease and cancer aggressiveness.

== Stem cell infusion therapy ==
Stem cell infusion therapy is a type of infusion therapy in which stem cells are infused into the blood. These stem cells then exit the blood vessels and preferentially migrate to damaged tissue as part of the regeneration process. Angiopellosis has been shown to be the mechanism by which stem cells extravasate and reach damaged tissue

== See also ==
- Leukocyte extravasation
- Endothelium
- Circulatory system
