= Cancer exodus hypothesis =

The cancer exodus hypothesis establishes that circulating tumor cell clusters (CTC clusters) maintain their multicellular structure throughout the metastatic process. It was previously thought that these clusters must dissociate into single cells during metastasis. According to the hypothesis, CTC clusters intravasate (enter the bloodstream), travel through circulation as a cohesive unit, and extravasate (exit the bloodstream) at distant sites without disaggregating, significantly enhancing their metastatic potential. This concept is considered a key advancement in understanding of cancer biology and CTCs role in cancer metastasis.

== Mechanism ==
Traditionally, it was believed that CTC clusters needed to dissociate into individual cells during their journey through the bloodstream to seed secondary tumors. However, recent studies show that CTC clusters can travel through the bloodstream intact, enabling them to perform every step of metastasis while maintaining their group/cluster structure.

The cancer exodus hypothesis asserts that CTC clusters have several distinct advantages that increase their metastatic potential:

- Higher metastatic efficiency: CTC clusters have been shown to possess superior seeding capabilities at distant sites compared to single CTCs.
- Survival and proliferation: The collective nature of CTC clusters allows them to share resources and offer intercellular support, improving their overall survival rates in the bloodstream.
- Resistance to treatment: CTC clusters exhibit unique gene expression profiles that contribute to their ability to evade certain cancer therapies, making them more resistant than individual tumor cells.

== Clinical relevance ==
The cancer exodus hypothesis offers important insights into how metastasis occurs and highlights the significance of CTC clusters in cancer progression. Detecting and analyzing CTC clusters through liquid biopsies could offer valuable information about the aggressiveness and metastatic potential of cancers. This information is particularly useful for identifying patients who may benefit from more aggressive treatment strategies.

== Characterization ==
The hypothesis was developed due to several key studies, which have demonstrated the ability of CTC clusters to:

- Intravasate and travel as clusters: Research has shown that CTC clusters can enter the bloodstream as a group, travel through the circulatory system intact, and maintain their cluster phenotype during transit.
- Extravasate through angiopellosis: A key finding of the hypothesis is that CTC clusters do not need to disaggregate to exit the bloodstream. Instead, they can undergo a process called angiopellosis, in which entire clusters migrate out of the blood vessels as a group, retaining their multicellular form.

These findings underscore the critical role of CTC clusters in driving the metastatic cascade and suggest that CTC clusters could serve as important biomarkers in cancer diagnosis, prognosis, and treatment planning. Additionally, understanding the mechanisms that allow CTC clusters to retain their structure and survive in circulation opens new avenues for targeted cancer therapies designed to disrupt this process.

== Future directions ==
As research into the cancer exodus hypothesis progresses, new therapeutic strategies could emerge to specifically target CTC clusters. Blocking their formation, disrupting their cohesion, or preventing their ability to survive in the bloodstream could offer new ways to prevent metastasis in aggressive cancers. Continued studies will be essential to further elucidate the biological pathways involved in CTC cluster-mediated metastasis and develop potential treatment interventions.
