= PCDH7 =

Protein-coding gene in the species Homo sapiens

Identifiers
- Aliases: PCDH7, BH-Pcdh, BHPCDH, PPP1R120, protocadherin 7
- External IDs: OMIM: 602988; MGI: 1860487; GeneCards: PCDH7
Available structures
PDB	Human UniProt search: PDBe RCSB
PDB	List of PDB id codes 2YST

Gene location (Human)
Chr.	Chromosome 4 (human)
Band	4p15.1	Start	30,720,369 bp
Band	4p15.1	End	31,146,805 bp

Gene location (Mouse)
Chr.	Chromosome 5 (mouse)
Band	5|5 C1	Start	57,875,309 bp
Band	5|5 C1	End	58,290,572 bp
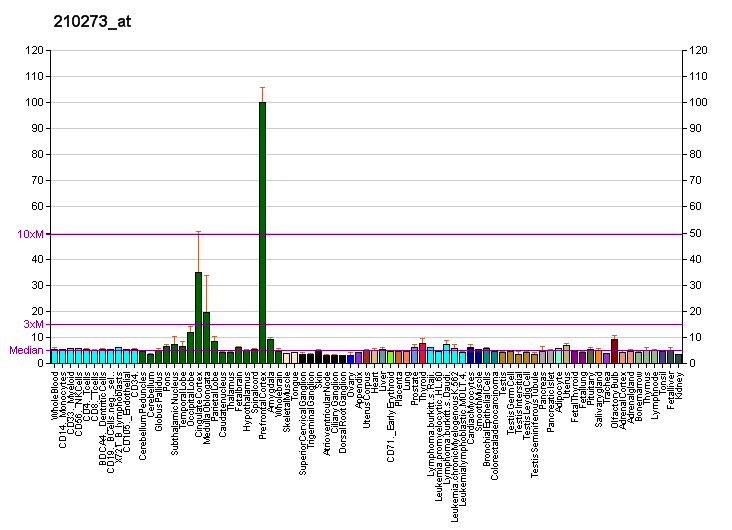

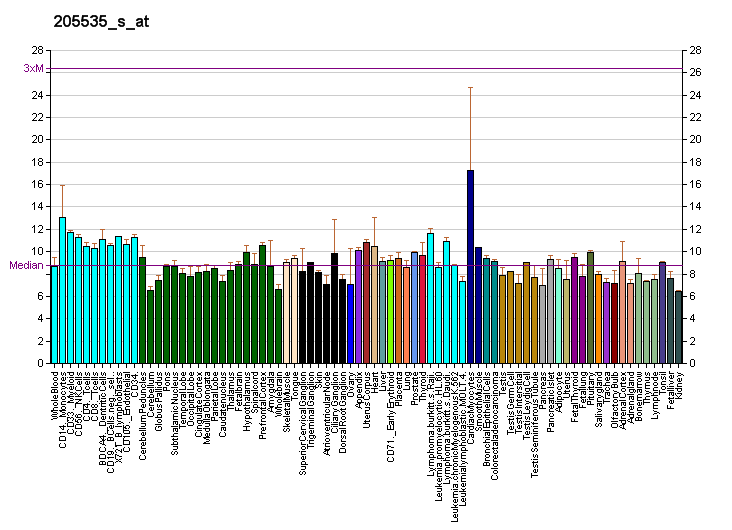

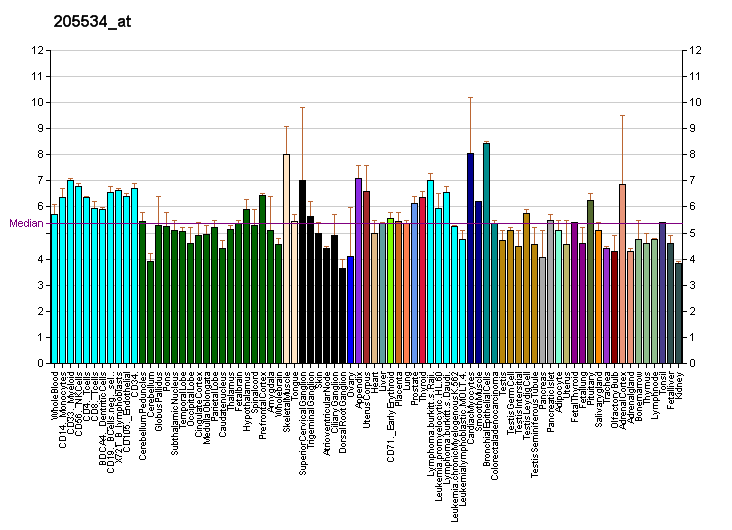
RNA expression pattern
Bgee	Human / Mouse (ortholog); Top expressed in: endothelial cell; middle temporal gyrus; Brodmann area 23; urethra; saphenous vein; corpus epididymis; seminal vesicula; pons; entorhinal cortex; postcentral gyrus / Top expressed in: ascending aorta; arcuate nucleus; anterior amygdaloid area; ventromedial nucleus; subiculum; median eminence; paraventricular nucleus of hypothalamus; lateral geniculate nucleus; aortic valve; medial geniculate nucleus; More reference expression data
BioGPS	More reference expression data
Gene ontology
Molecular function	calcium ion binding
Cellular component	integral component of membrane; plasma membrane; integral component of plasma membrane; membrane; platelet alpha granule membrane
Biological process	cell adhesion; homophilic cell adhesion via plasma membrane adhesion molecules; platelet degranulation
Sources:Amigo / QuickGO
Orthologs
Databases	NCBI: entry; OMA: entry
Species	Human	Mouse
Entrez	5099	54216
Ensembl	ENSG00000169851	ENSMUSG00000029108
UniProt	O60245	n/a
RefSeq (mRNA)	NM_001173523; NM_002589; NM_032456; NM_032457	NM_001122758; NM_018764; NM_001310606; NM_001310608
RefSeq (protein)	NP_001166994; NP_002580; NP_115832; NP_115833	n/a
Location (UCSC)	Chr 4: 30.72 – 31.15 Mb	Chr 5: 57.88 – 58.29 Mb
PubMed search
- Wikidata
View/Edit Human	View/Edit Mouse

Protocadherin-7 is a protein that in humans is encoded by the PCDH7 gene.

This gene belongs to the protocadherin gene family, a subfamily of the cadherin superfamily. The gene encodes a protein with an extracellular domain containing 7 cadherin repeats. The gene product is an integral membrane protein that is thought to function in cell–cell recognition and adhesion. Alternative splicing yields isoforms with unique cytoplasmic tails.
