= Anoikis =

Form of biological cell death

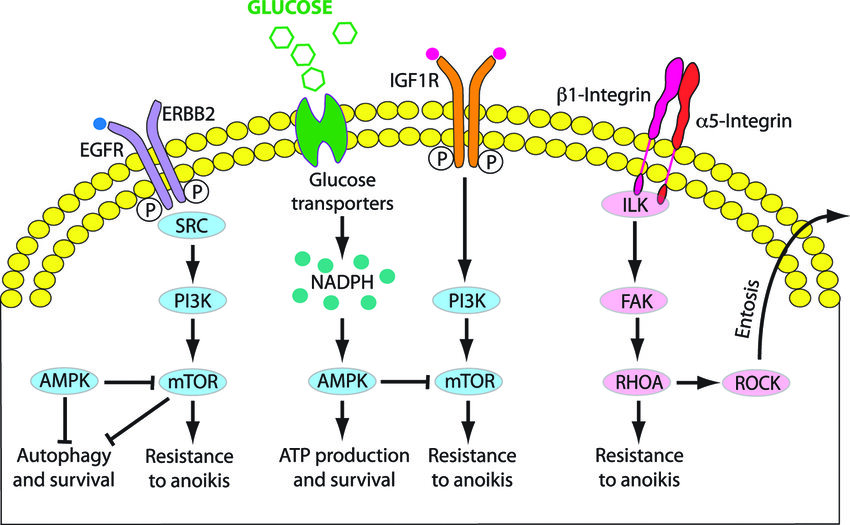
Mechanisms of resistance to anoikis

Anoikis is a form of programmed cell death that occurs in anchorage-dependent cells when they detach from the surrounding extracellular matrix (ECM). Usually cells stay close to the tissue to which they belong since the communication between proximal cells as well as between cells and ECM provide essential signals for growth or survival. When cells are detached from the ECM, there is a loss of normal cell–matrix interactions, and they may undergo anoikis. However, metastatic tumor cells may escape from anoikis and invade other organs.

== Etymology ==
The word "anoikis" was coined by Frisch and Francis in a paper published in the Journal of Cell Biology in 1994. "Anoikis", in their words, means "(...the state of being without a home) to describe the cells' apoptotic response to the absence of cell–matrix interactions". The word is a neologism construction consisting of three Greek morphemes agglutinated together: ἀν- "without", οἰκ- "house", and the suffix -ις.

== In metastasis ==
Using a novel high-throughput screening assay, Mawji et al. showed that anisomycin can sensitize metastatic epithelial cells to anoikis and reduce circulating tumor cell implantation in vivo. Anisomycin achieved this anti-metastatic activity in part by decreasing the abundance of the death receptor inhibiting protein FLIP (c-Fas–associated death domain–like interleukin-1–converting enzyme–like inhibitory protein). In related work, Schimmer's team showed that FLIP levels are higher in metastatic cells than non-metastatic cells, and that reducing FLIP levels using RNAi (RNA Interference) or other small molecule inhibitors of FLIP can sensitize metastatic cells to anoikis. Given that FLIP is an inhibitor of anoikis, and that reducing FLIP can sensitize metastatic cells to anoikis, Mawji et al. hypothesize that FLIP reduction may be a viable therapeutic strategy against cancer metastasis.

Cancer cells develop anoikis resistance by several mechanisms, including changes in integrin and matrix signaling, metabolic deregulation, and stress responses of cancer cells. One key mechanism that renders cancer cells independent from tissue adherence is dysregulation of the pathway network that controls transcription factor NF-κB.

== See also ==
- Apoptosis
- Metastasis
- Programmed cell death
