= Pre-metastatic niche =

A pre-metastatic niche is an environment in a secondary organ that can be conducive to the metastasis of a primary tumor. Such a niche provides favorable conditions for growth, and eventual metastasis, in an otherwise foreign and hostile environment for the primary tumor cells. This concept demonstrated the fundamental role of the microenvironment in regulating tumor growth and metastasis. The discovery of the pre-metastatic niche has fostered new research regarding the potential treatment of metastases, including targeting myeloid derived suppressor cells, and stromal cell plasticity including fibroblasts and pericytes and perivascular smooth muscle cells and (attempts to stop the flow of vesicles from primary tumors to pre-metastatic niches in secondary organs and different combinations of microenvironment targeted therapies.

== Pre-metastatic niche formation ==
Tumors metastasize to particular organs due to the migration of hematopoietic bone marrow cells expressing VEGFR1 (vascular endothelial growth factor receptor 1) and stromal cells to these particular sites prior to the formation of clinically relevant metastasis. These cells along with changes in the extracellular matrix form pre-metastatic niches that support disseminated tumor cells and allow these cells to gather and more easily colonize the organ. Pre-metastatic niche formation is influenced by many different bodily processes, including the suppression of the immune system and an increase in the presence of cytokines and other growth factors. and extracellular matrix deposition and remodeling Hypoxia in the primary tumor and the movement of exosomes from the primary tumor to the secondary organ are additional phenomena that are partially responsible for the formation of pre-metastatic niches.

The formation of a pre-metastatic niche varies across different organs. By utilizing methods such as immune evasion and lymphangiogenesis the pre-metastatic niche can be formed in the lymph nodes. Due to their unique characteristics, the lungs have become a metastatic target for a variety of cancers such as breast, colon and prostate cancer. The connection to the lymphatic and systemic blood circulation works in favor for the cancer cells to infiltrate the lungs from the primary site. In addition, the microenvironment rich in blood vessels and blood supply creates beneficial growth conditions, promote metastasis and proliferation of cancer cells.

== Role in metastasis ==
In order to metastasize, tumor cells should arrive at an organ with an environment conducive to their growth, such as a pre-metastatic niche. The creation of this environment is accomplished by factors from the primary tumor that alter the structure of the secondary organ in order to allow cells from the primary tumor to more easily colonize the secondary organ. Tumor cells release factors that cause bone cells to resorb and therefore increase the rate of metastasis. Bone is conducive to the metastatic process given its composition of many different kinds of cells and its ability to grow skeletal structures. Without the process of pre-metastatic niche formation, metastases are less likely to occur. There are often tumor cell deposits found in organs without a metastasis, indicating that metastases do not always proliferate in the tissues that they enter after leaving the circulatory system.

== Role of the immune system ==
Pre-metastatic niche formation is possible due in large part to active immune suppression. Primary tumors recruit myeloid derived suppressor cells, which are myeloid cells that can inhibit antigen presentation and T cells mediated cytotoxicity, in order to allow the tumor cells to avoid detection by the immune system as they metastasize, and thus allows the metastasis to flourish. As the primary tumors release tumor cells into the bloodstream, myeloid cells that have been recruited by the tumor, can protect the cancer cells from detection by the adaptive immune system, which would otherwise be halting metastasis. Myeloid progenitor cells, recruited at various different stages in their cell development, are believed to constitute much of the pre-metastatic niche, as they can protect the tumor cells from the standard immune response as the cancer cells attempt to colonize the pre-metastatic niche. Given their important role not only in protecting the growing metastasis from immune system attacks, but also in enabling extravasation, myeloid cells are a key factor in the development of the pre-metastatic niche, and thus eventually in promoting metastases.

Chemokines, a class of signaling molecules, also play a significant role in the creation of pre-metastatic niches and metastases. The primary tumor, in an attempt to evade detection by the immune system, uses chemokines in order to increase recruitment of bone marrow-derived myeloid cells to secondary organs. In addition, cancer cells from the primary tumor can be used to induce inflammation in the future site of the pre-metastatic niche in the secondary organ, which is similar to the immune response created by an infection.

Thus, the large presence of immune cells allows the pre-metastatic niche to ward off attacks by the immune system and therefore allow the tumor to metastasize without inhibition. Immune suppression, combined with hypoxia and ECM, among other processes, are essential steps in allowing a primary tumor to metastasize, as they allow tumor cells to grow in a foreign and hostile environment without being destroyed by the typical response of the immune system. Specifically, necessary amino acids are depleted and lymphocyte movement is decreased while regulatory T cells, which suppress the immune system, and oxidative stress are increased.

== Discovery of the pre-metastatic niche ==
Metastasis has typically been condensed into a few simple steps, namely that the tumor cells leave the primary tumor and travel to secondary organs via the circulatory system in an attempt to invade the foreign environment of the pre-metastatic organ. Since tumor growth is often difficult in a new and relatively hostile environment, metastasis had been considered by many to be an inefficient process, despite its high mortality rate. Although Stephen Paget's previously established ‘seed and soil’ hypothesis correlates with the newer idea of primary tumor cells migrating to pre-metastatic niches, the focuses of many researchers are shifting from the primary tumor, given the assumed inevitability of metastasis in the presence of a tumor, to the secondary organs where metastases occur. The role of exosomes in priming organs for metastasis has only recently become a significant topic of conversation among researchers, due in large part to the discovery of tumor cells deposits in organs without metastases. The concept of the pre-metastatic niche was discovered in David Lyden's laboratory, by Drs. David Lyden and Stergios Zacharoulis, and the pre-metastatic niche was first described and characterized by Drs. Rosandra Kaplan, Rebecca Riba, Stergios Zacharoulis et al., in 2005.

== Implications for cancer treatment ==
The recognition of the concept of the pre-metastatic niche allows researchers to consider several new possibilities for treating cancer. One such possibility is employing methods that attempt to limit the expression of VEGFR1 in cells, thereby combating metastasis by delaying the creation of or eradicating the pre-metastatic niche altogether. Targeting hypoxia in the primary tumor and the suppression of the immune system could also stop the creation of pre-metastatic niches. Factors from the primary tumor that structurally alter the secondary organ in order to facilitate its colonization by tumor cells could also potentially be targeted in an attempt to stop metastasis.

Tumor cells grown in different microenvironments yield different types of protein, indicating that varying types of oncological treatments are needed for tumors in distinct locales. It is easier to target later stages of metastasis because cancer is often not found until the earlier stages of metastasis have been completed. Thus, a combination of primary therapies and drugs that combat metastasis could be used to arrest the colonization of a secondary organ by tumor cells, as this would stop both the cells flowing from the tumor and the formation of the pre-metastatic niche. Alternatively, using drugs to stop tumor cells from migrating to pre-metastatic niches could be an effective method of halting metastases.
