= Circulating tumor cell =

Cell from a primary tumor carried by blood circulation

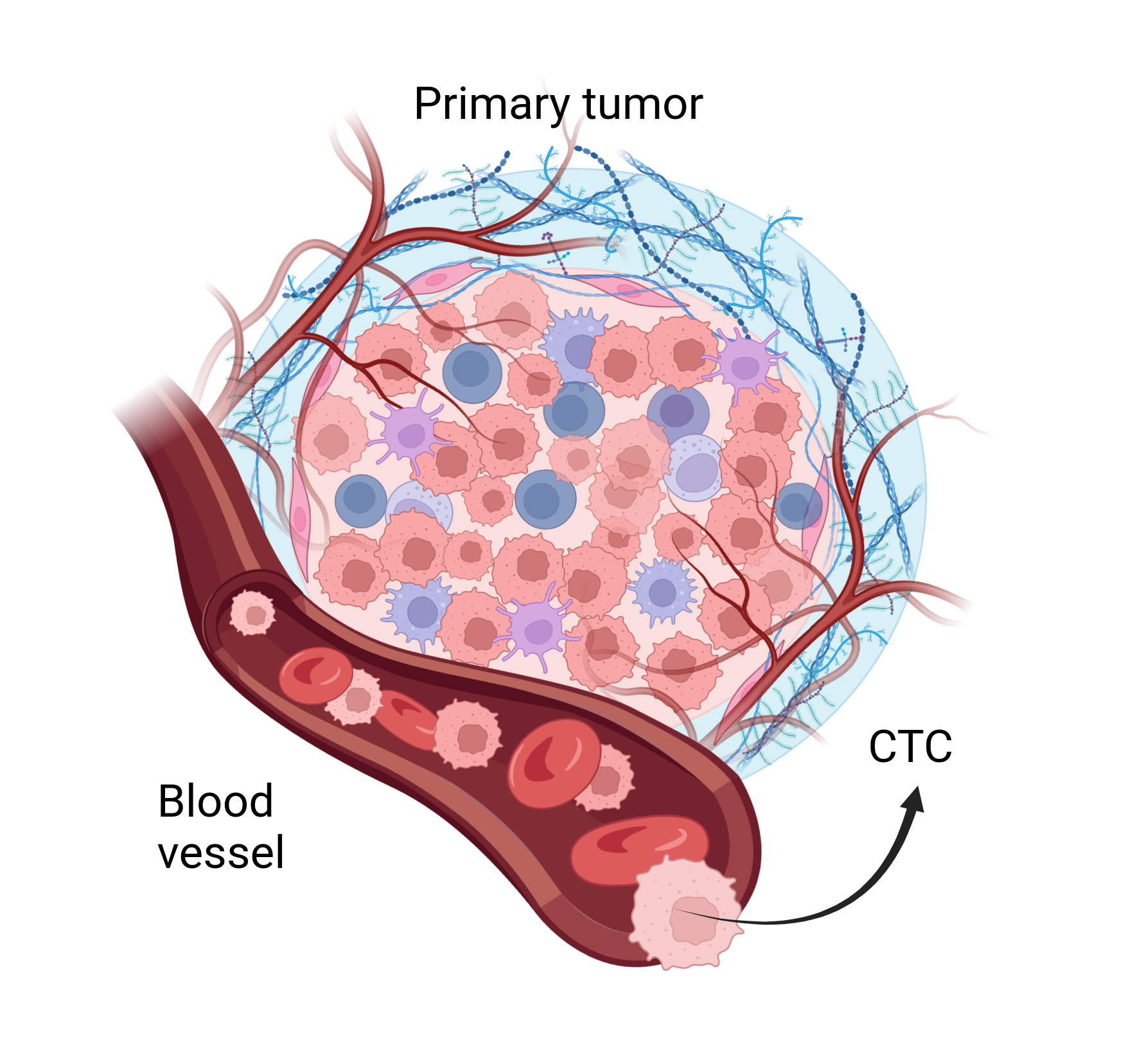
An illustration depicting primary tumor (in the form of tumor microenvironment) and the circulating tumor cells.

A circulating tumor cell (CTC) is a cancer cell from a primary tumor that has shed into the blood of the circulatory system, or the lymph of the lymphatic system. The circulatory system is a highly toxic environment for CTCs, and they must make significant adaptations to survive. If CTCs successfully adapt to the physical and biological threats of the circulatory system, they will be carried around the body to other organs where they may leave the circulation. When CTCs exit circulation they become the seeds for the subsequent growth of secondary tumors. This is known as metastasis, which is responsible for most cancer-related deaths.

The detection and analysis of CTCs can assist early patient prognoses and determine appropriate tailored treatments. Currently, there is one FDA-approved method for CTC detection, CellSearch, which is used to diagnose breast, colorectal and prostate cancer.

The detection of CTCs, or liquid biopsy, presents several advantages over traditional tissue biopsies. They are non-invasive, can be used repeatedly, and provide more useful information on metastatic risk, disease progression, and treatment effectiveness. For example, analysis of blood samples from cancer patients has found a propensity for increased CTC detection as the disease progresses. Blood tests are easy and safe to perform and multiple samples can be taken over time. By contrast, analysis of solid tumors necessitates invasive procedures that might limit patient compliance. The ability to monitor the disease progression over time could facilitate appropriate modification to a patient's therapy, potentially improving their prognosis and quality of life. The important aspect of the ability to prognose the future progression of the disease is elimination (at least temporarily) of the need for a surgery when the repeated CTC counts are low and not increasing; the obvious benefits of avoiding the surgery include avoiding the risk related to the innate tumor-genicity of cancer surgeries. To this end, technologies with the requisite sensitivity and reproducibility to detect CTCs in patients with metastatic disease have recently been developed. On the other hand, CTCs are very rare, often present as only a few cells per milliliter of blood, which makes their detection challenging. In addition, they often express a variety of markers which vary from patient to patient, which makes it difficult to develop techniques with high sensitivity and specificity.

== Types ==
CTCs that originate from carcinomas (cancers of epithelial origin, which are the most prevalent) can be classified according to the expression of epithelial markers, as well as their size and whether they are apoptotic. In general, CTCs are anoikis-resistant, which means that they can survive in the bloodstream without attaching to a substrate.

1. Traditional CTCs are characterised by an intact, viable nucleus; the expression of EpCAM and cytokeratins, which demonstrate epithelial origin; the absence of CD45, indicating the cell is not of hematopoietic origin; and their larger size, irregular shape or subcellular morphology.
2. Cytokeratin-negative CTCs are characterised by the lack of EpCAM or cytokeratins, which may indicate an undifferentiated phenotype (circulating cancer stem cells) or the acquisition of a mesenchymal phenotype (known as epithelial-mesenchymal transition or EMT). These populations of CTCs may be the most resistant and most prone to metastasis. They are also more difficult to isolate because they express neither cytokeratins nor CD45. Otherwise, their morphology, gene expression and genomics are similar to those of other cancer cells.
3. Apoptotic CTCs are traditional CTCs that are undergoing apoptosis (programmed cell death). These may be used to monitor treatment response, as done experimentally by the Epic Sciences method, which identifies nuclear fragmentation or cytoplasmic blebbing associated with apoptosis. Measuring the ratio of traditional CTC to apoptotic CTCs—from baseline to therapy—provides clues to treatment efficacy in targeting and killing cancer cells.
4. Small CTCs are cytokeratin-positive and CD45-negative, but with sizes and shapes similar to white blood cells. Importantly, small CTCs have cancer-specific biomarkers that identify them as CTCs. Small CTCs have been implicated in progressive disease and differentiation into small cell carcinomas, which often require a different therapeutic course.

== CTC clusters ==
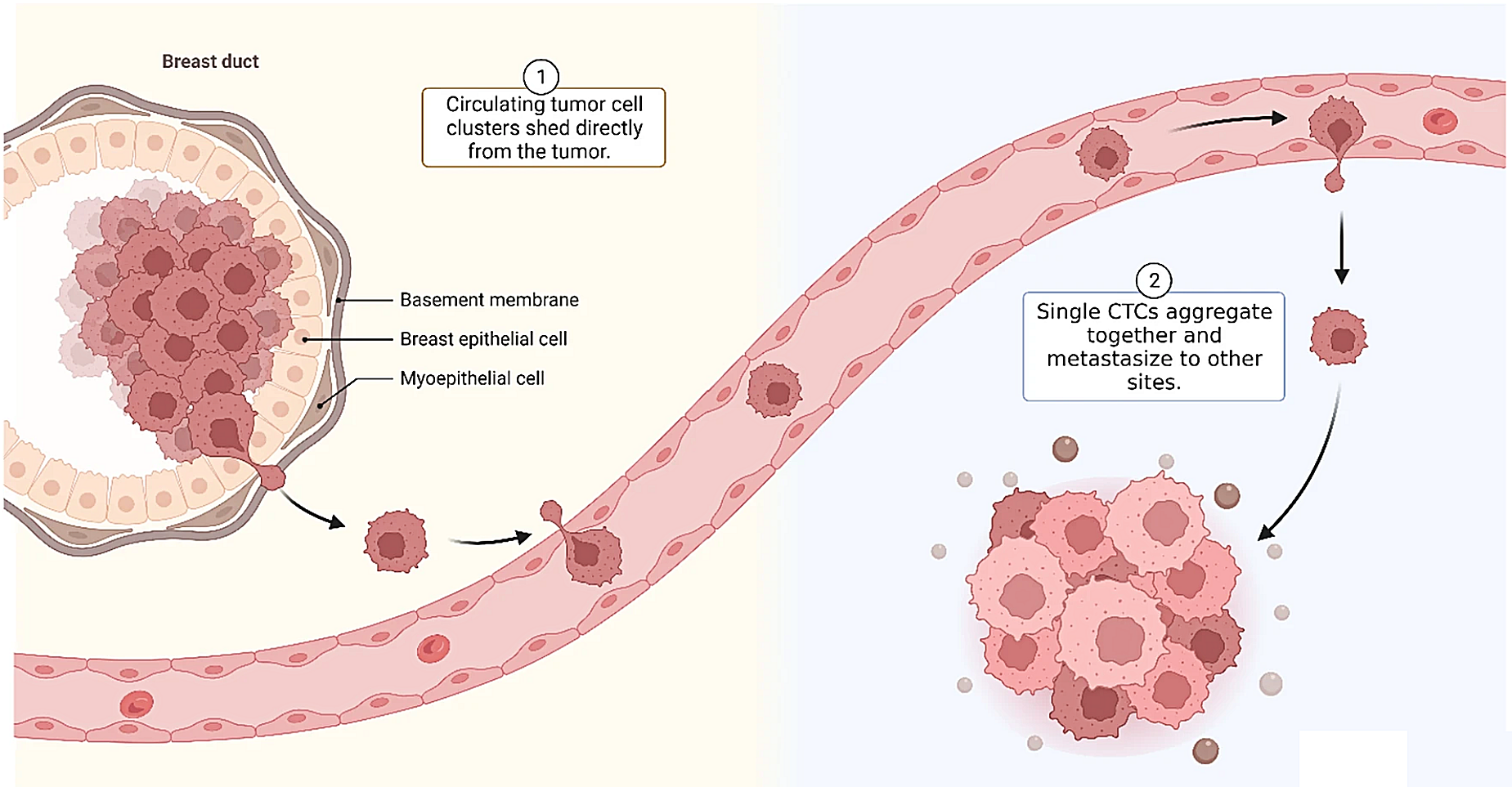
Circulating tumor cells and CTC clusters

Circulating tumor cells are most often present in clusters. CTC clusters are aggregates of two or more circulating tumor cells (CTCs) bound together. These clusters can consist of traditional, small, or cytokeratin-negative CTCs and carry cancer-specific biomarkers that distinguish them from other cells in circulation. Studies have shown that CTC clusters are associated with increased metastatic potential and poor prognosis. For example, research has demonstrated that patients with prostate cancer who have only single CTCs exhibit an eight-fold longer mean survival rate compared to those with CTC clusters. Similar findings have been reported for colorectal cancer as well.

There are two types of circulating tumor cell cluster, one that consists of cancer cells only is termed homotypic. A CTC cluster that also incorporates other cells including white blood cells, fibroblasts, endothelial cells (i.e., cells that line the interior surface of blood vessels), and platelets, is termed heterotypic. Heterotypic clusters are also known as microemboli. It is suggested that these microemboli might enhance metastatic potential.

The cancer exodus hypothesis suggests that CTC clusters remain intact throughout the metastatic process, rather than dissociating into single cells, which was previously assumed. According to this hypothesis, the clusters enter the bloodstream, travel as a cohesive unit, and exit circulation at distant metastatic sites without breaking apart. This allows the clusters to retain their multicellularity, enhancing their metastatic efficiency. The hypothesis posits that the survival advantage provided by intercellular support within clusters increases their metastatic potential compared to single CTCs.

CTC clusters exhibit distinct gene expression profiles, which confer resistance to certain cancer therapies, making them more resilient than individual tumor cells. Their ability to remain multicellular throughout metastasis, may explain their superior survival and metastatic potential.

Research on CTC clusters and their role in metastasis continues to evolve, with the cancer exodus hypothesis offering a new perspective on how these clusters contribute to cancer progression. Detecting and analyzing CTC clusters provides critical prognostic information and could help guide therapeutic decisions for cancer patients.

== Surviving circulation ==
For most cancers, tumor cells must enter the bloodstream and survive as circulating tumor cells (CTCs) before metastasizing. However, the circulatory system is a highly hostile environment, and less than 0.01% of CTCs will survive in circulation and go on to metastasize. Cancer cells in circulation face several major threats, including fluid shear stress (the mechanical force exerted by blood flow), deformation (physical distortion as cells squeeze through narrow vessels), anoikis (apoptosis triggered by detachment from the extracellular matrix), and immune system attack from cytotoxic T cells and natural killer (NK) cells. To establish metastases, circulating tumor cells must adapt to withstand or evade these threats. These challenges, along with the best-understood mechanisms cancer cells use to overcome them, are described in more detail below.

=== Fluid shear stress ===
Fluid shear stress (FSS) is the mechanical force exerted by a moving fluid on a solid object, which, in this case, refers to the force of fluid in the bloodstream on the tumor cell. Exposure to such stresses can rapidly damage or kill many detached tumor cells, so circulating tumor cells (CTCs) must adapt to survive FSS in order to metastasize.

One way CTCs adapt to FSS is by creating a physical barrier between themselves and the fluid. To form this physical barrier, tumor cells may circulate in clusters, which distribute forces across multiple cells, reducing the stress on any individual cell. The clusters may consist solely of tumor cells (homotypic) or include various other cell types (heterotypic) including macrophages, red blood cells, and fibroblasts. Additionally, CTCs often recruit platelets to form a shield that absorbs the fluid shear forces.

CTCs also exhibit cytoskeletal adaptations in response to FSS. The findings across studies are inconsistent: some studies suggest that CTCs increase cytoskeletal stiffness to withstand deformation, while others suggest they become more fluid to accommodate the mechanical stress. However, it is clear that CTCs' cytoskeletal responses are vital to their survival under FSS.

=== Deformation ===
Circulating tumor cells are larger than most capillaries, so the cells are forced into a very different shape as they attempt to squeeze through these narrow vessels. When the cell is forced into a different shape, it is called deformation. Deformation puts significant strain on the plasma membrane, cytoskeleton, and nucleus, and this strain can easily rupture the cell.

The nucleus is a large, stiff, and vital organelle, so it is often the limiting factor in how much the cell can deform. The nuclear matrix is a cross-linking layer of proteins that gives structure to the membrane of the nucleus. This matrix is made up of lamins, either type A/C or type B. Lamin A/C is stiffer than lamin B. When a cell nucleus has more lamin B than lamin A/C (making the nucleus more fluid), it can better withstand the compressive forces of deformation. However, this also makes the cell more prone to damage from fluid shear stress (FSS).

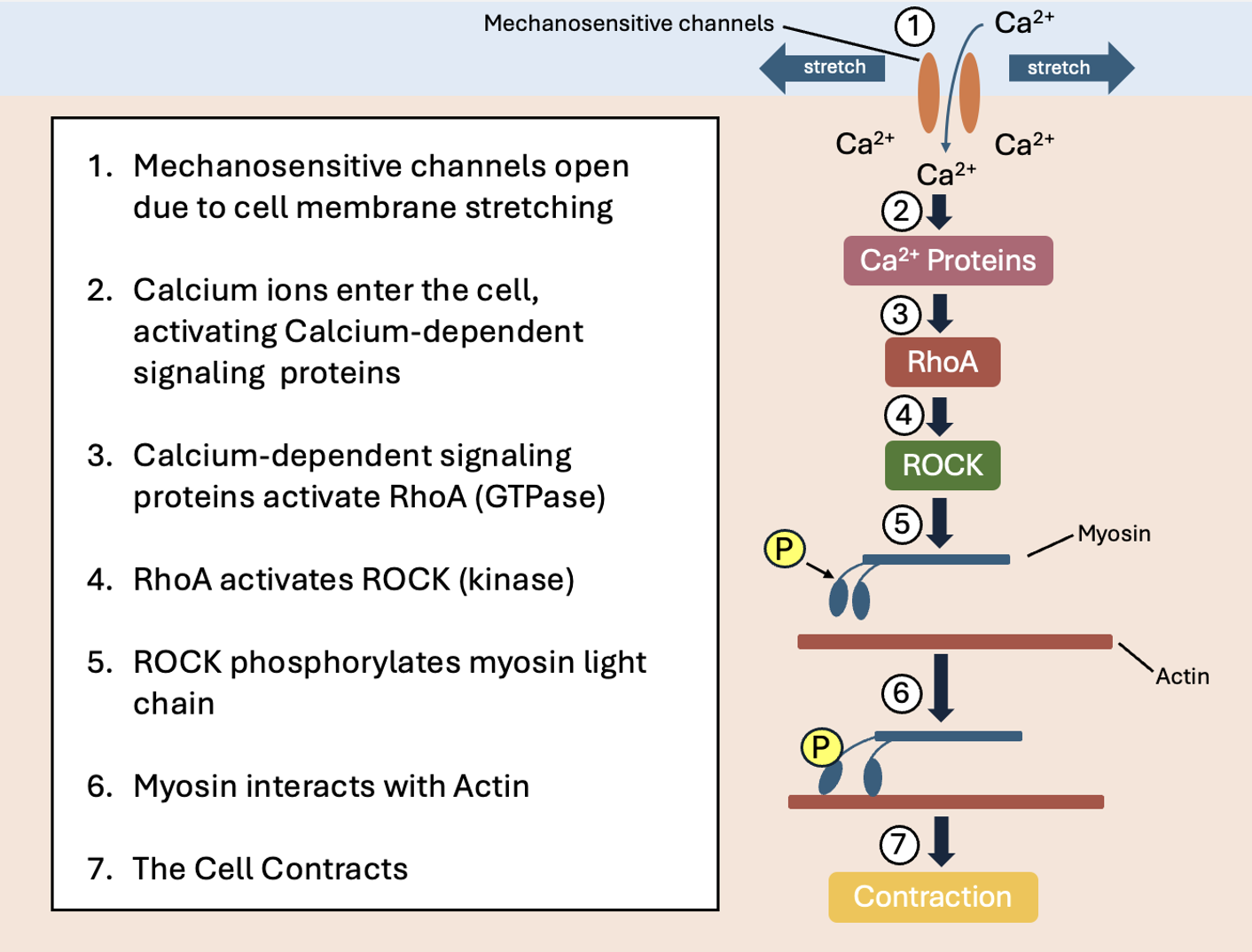
How the RhoA-ROCK pathway allows tumor cells to contract in response to deformation

Additionally, deformation leads to the activation of many signaling pathways within the cell to help the cytoskeleton adapt to the compression. The best understood of these pathways is the RhoA-ROCK pathway. When the cell membrane is stretched, mechanosensitive channels will open, flooding the cell with calcium ions. These calcium ions activate a number of proteins that eventually activate RhoA, a GTPase. RhoA activates ROCK, a protein kinase, which activates myosin light chain and deactivates myosin light chain phosphatase. This allows myosin to bind to actin and contract the cytoskeleton, causing the whole cell to constrict.

=== Anoikis ===
Anoikis is a form of programmed cell death (apoptosis) that occurs when cells lose contact with the surrounding extracellular matrix (ECM). For tumor cells to survive in the bloodstream, they must resist or bypass anoikis, often by generating an environment that mimics tissue or ECM contact and supports anti-apoptotic signaling.

A common way that CTCs bypass anoikis is by binding to other cells or platelets. This cluster, whether it is made up of additional CTCs, other cell types, or platelets, can provide enough cell-to-cell contact to prevent anoikis. Instead, some CTCs secrete fibronectin or other ECM components, forming a pseudo-extracellular matrix that provides enough cell-to-ECM contact to protect against detachment-induced apoptosis.

=== Immune system attack ===
The immune system employs multiple mechanisms to detect and eliminate tumor cells. Within the bloodstream, natural killer (NK) cells and cytotoxic T lymphocytes (CTLs) can destroy cancer cells upon recognition. These immune cells must make physical contact and identify tumor cells to initiate cytotoxicity.

CTCs can evade immune detection by creating a protective barrier. One process is platelet cloaking, in which platelets adhere to tumor cells and form a physical shield that masks tumor-associated antigens. Tumor cells may also aggregate with leukocytes or other non-malignant cells to conceal themselves from immune surveillance.

Beyond physical barriers, many tumor cells express immune checkpoint molecules, such as PD-L1, which interacts with receptors like PD-1 on NK cells and T cells to suppress immune cell activity. By inhibiting PD-1 on an immune cell, the tumor cell can suppress that cell's cytotoxic activity and thereby avoid being killed.

== Frequency ==
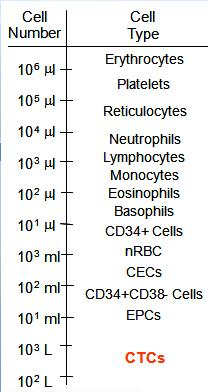
Number of various types of blood cells in whole blood versus CTCs.

The detection of CTCs may have important prognostic and therapeutic implications but because their numbers can be very small, these cells are not easily detected. It is estimated that among the cells that have detached from the primary tumor, only 0.01% can form metastases.

Circulating tumor cells are found in frequencies on the order of 1-10 CTC per mL of whole blood in patients with metastatic disease. For comparison, a mL of blood contains a few hundred CECs (i.e., circulating endothelial cells), a few million white blood cells, and a billion red blood cells. This low frequency, associated to difficulty of identifying cancerous cells, means that a key component of understanding CTCs biological properties require technologies and approaches capable of isolating 1 CTC per mL of blood, either by enrichment, or better yet with enrichment-free assays that identify all CTC subtypes in sufficiently high definition to satisfy diagnostic pathology image-quantity requirements in patients with a variety of cancer types. To date CTCs have been detected in several epithelial cancers (breast, prostate, lung, and colon) and clinical evidences indicate that patients with metastatic lesions are more likely to have CTCs isolated.

CTCs are usually (in 2011) captured from the vasculature by using specific antibodies able to recognize specific tumoral marker (usually EpCAM); however this approach is biased by the need for a sufficient expression of the selected protein on the cell surface, event necessary for the enrichment step. Moreover, since EpCAM and other proteins (e.g. cytokeratins) are not expressed in some tumors and can be down regulated during the epithelial to mesenchymal transition (EMT), new enrichment strategies are required.

First evidence indicates that CTC markers applied in human medicine are conserved in other species. Five of the more common markers including CK19 are also useful to detect CTC in the blood of dogs with malignant mammary tumors. Newer approaches are able to identify more cells out 7.5 ml of blood, like IsofFux or Maintrac. In very rare cases, CTCs are present in large enough quantities to be visible on routine blood smear examination. This is referred to as carcinocythemia or carcinoma cell leukemia and is associated with a poor prognosis.

== Detection methods ==
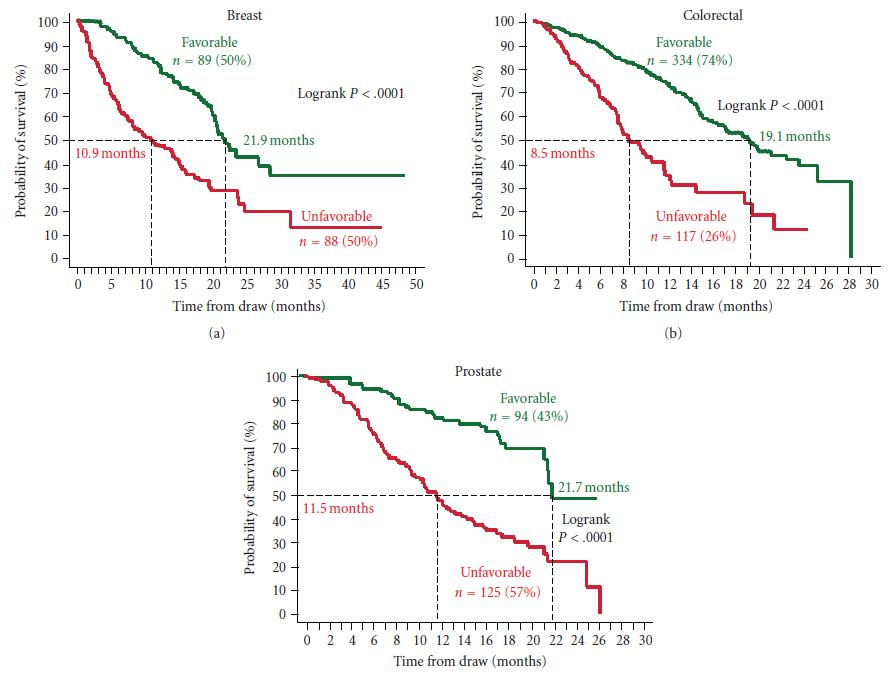
Kaplan Meier Analysis of overall survival before starting a new line of therapy for patients with metastatic breast, colorectal and prostate cancer. Patients were divided into those with Favorable and Unfavorable CTC (Unfavorable: >5 CTC/7.5mL for breast and prostate, >3 CTC/7.5mL for colon)

To date, a variety of research methods have been developed to isolate and enumerate CTCs. The only U.S. Food and Drug Administration (FDA) cleared methodology for enumeration of CTC in whole blood is the CellSearch system. Extensive clinical testing done using this method shows that presence of CTCs is a strong prognostic factor for overall survival in patients with metastatic breast, colorectal or prostate cancer.

CTCs are pivotal to understanding the biology of metastasis and promise potential as a biomarker to noninvasively evaluate tumor progression and response to treatment. However, isolation and characterization of CTCs represent a major technological challenge, since CTCs make up a minute number of the total cells in circulating blood, 1–10 CTCs per mL of whole blood compared to a few million white blood cells and a billion red blood cells. Therefore, the major challenge for CTC researchers is the prevailing difficulty of CTC purification that allows the molecular characterization of CTCs. Several methods have been developed to isolate CTCs in the peripheral blood and essentially fall into two categories: biological methods and physical methods, as well as hybrid methods that combine both strategies. Techniques may also be classified based on whether they select CTCs for isolation (positive selection) or whether they exclude all blood cells (negative selection).

=== Biological methods ===
Biological methods isolate cells based on highly specific antigen binding, most commonly by monoclonal antibodies for positive selection. Antibodies against tumor specific biomarkers including EpCAM, HER2 and PSA have been used. The most common technique is magnetic nanoparticle-based separation (immunomagnetic assay) as used in CellSearch or MACS. Other techniques under research include microfluidic separation and combination of immunomagnetic assay and microfluidic separation. As the development of microfabrication technology, microscale magnetic structures are implemented to provide better control of the magnetic field and assist the CTCs detection. Oncolytic viruses such as vaccinia viruses are developed to detect and identify CTCs. Alternative methods exist which use engineered proteins instead of antibodies, such as the malaria VAR2CSA protein, which binds to oncofetal chondroitin sulfate on the surface of CTCs. CTCs may also be retrieved directly from the blood by a modified Seldinger technique, as developed by GILUPI GmbH. An antibody coated metal wire is inserted into a peripheral vein and stays there for a defined period (30 min). During this time, CTCs from the blood can bind to the antibodies (currently anti-EpCAM). After the incubation time, the wire is removed, washed and the native CTCs, isolated from the blood of the patient, can be further analysed. Molecular genetics as well as immunofluorescent staining and several other methods are possible. Advantage of this method is the higher blood volume that can be analysed for CTCs (approx. 750 ml in 30 min compared to 7.5 ml of a drawn blood sample).

==== CellSearch method ====
CellSearch is the only FDA-approved platform for CTC isolation. This method is based on the use of iron nanoparticles coated with a polymer layer carrying biotin analogues and conjugated with antibodies against EpCAM for the capture of CTCs. Isolation is coupled to an analyzer to take images of isolated cells upon their staining with specific fluorescent antibody conjugates. Blood is sampled in an EDTA tube with an added preservative. Upon arrival in the lab, 7.5mL of blood is centrifuged and placed in a preparation system. This system first enriches the tumor cells immunomagnetically by means of ferrofluid nanoparticles and a magnet. Subsequently, recovered cells are permeabilized and stained with a nuclear stain, a fluorescent antibody conjugate against CD45 (leukocyte marker) and cytokeratins 8, 18 and 19 (epithelial markers). The sample is then scanned on an analyzer which takes images of the nuclear, cytokeratin, and CD45 stains. To be considered a CTC a cell must contain a nucleus, be positive for cytoplasmic expression of cytokeratin as well as negative for the expression of CD45 marker, and have a diameter larger than 5 μm. If the total number of tumor cells found to meet the criteria cited above is 5 or more, a blood sample is positive. In studies done on prostate, breast and colon cancer patients, median survival of metastatic patients with positive samples is about half the median survival of metastatic patients with negative samples. This system is characterized by a recovery capacity of 93% and a detection limit of one CTC per 7.5 mL of whole blood. For specific cancer types, alternative methods such as IsoFlux have shown greater sensitivity.

==== Parsortix method ====
This automated method uses size filtration to enrich larger and less compressible circulating tumor cells from other blood components. The Parsortix system can take in blood samples ranging from 1 mL to 40 mL. A disposable microfluidic cassette with a 6.5 micron gap allows the vast majority of red blood cells and white blood cells to pass through, while larger rare cells, including circulating tumor cells and fetal cells get caught. Trapped cells can either be automatically stained with antibodies for identification or can be released out of the cassette for subsequent analysis. These released / harvested cells are alive and can be analyzed by downstream cellular and molecular techniques, as well as cultured. The filtration cassette captures a plethora of different cancer cell types. In May 2022, the Parsortix PC1 system was cleared by the FDA as a medical device for the capture and harvest of circulating tumor cells (CTCs) from metastatic breast cancer patient blood for subsequent analysis. In addition to the IVD application, the PC1 may be used with the MBC-01 Metastatic Breast Cancer Kit for use in research studies or Lab Developed Tests (LDTs) that have been created and validated in a clinical laboratory.

==== Epic Sciences method ====
This method involves technology to separate nucleated cells from red blood cells, which lack a nucleus. All nucleated cells, including normal white blood cells and CTCs, are exposed to fluorescent-tagged antibodies specific for cancer biomarkers. In addition, Epic's imaging system captures pictures of all the cells on the slide (approximately 3 million), records the precise coordinates of each cell, and analyzes each cell for 90 different parameters, including the fluorescence intensity of the four fluorescent markers and 86 different morphological parameters. Epic can also use FISH and other staining techniques to look for abnormalities such as duplications, deletions, and rearrangements. The imaging and analysis technology also allows for the coordinates of every cell on a slide to be known so that a single cell can be retrieved from the slide for analysis using next-generation sequencing. A hematopathology-trained algorithm incorporates numerous morphology measurements as well as expression from cytokeratin and CD45. The algorithm then proposes candidate CTCs that a trained reader confirms. Cells of interest are analyzed for relevant phenotypic and genotypic markers, with regional white blood cells included as negative controls. Epic's molecular assays measure protein expression and also interrogate genomic abnormalities in CTCs for more than 20 different cancer types.

==== Maintrac ====
Maintrac is a diagnostic blood test platform applying microscopic in vitro diagnostic methods to identify rare cells in body fluids and their molecular characteristics. It is based on positive selection using EpCAM-specific antibodies. Maintrac uses an approach based on microscopic identification of circulating tumor cells. To prevent damage and loss of the cells during the process, Maintrac uses just two steps towards the identification. In contrast to many other methods, maintrac does not purify the cells or enrich them, but identifies them within the context of the other blood compounds. To obtain vital cells and to reduce stress of those cells, blood cells are prepared by only one centrifugation step and erythrocyte lysis. Like CellSearch, maintrac uses an EpCAM antibody. It is, however, not used for enrichment but rather as a fluorescent marker to identify those cells. Together with the nuclear staining with propidium iodide the maintrac method can distinguish between dead and living cells. Only vital, propidium excluding EpCAM positive cells are counted as potential tumor cells. Only living cells can grow into tumors, therefore dying EpCAM positive cells can do no harm. The suspension is analysed by fluorescence microscopy, which automatically counts the events. Simultaneous event galleries are recorded to verify whether the software found a true living cell and to differentiate between skin epithelial cells for example. Close validation of the method showed that additional antibodies of cytokeratins or CD45 did not have any advantage.

Unlike other methods maintrac does not use the single cell count as a prognostic marker, rather Maintrac utilizes the dynamics of the cell count. Rising tumor cell numbers are an important factor that tumor activity is ongoing. Decreasing cell counts are a sign for a successful therapy. Therefore, maintrac can be used to verify the success of a chemotherapy and to supervise the treatment during hormone or maintenance therapy Maintrac has been used experimentally to monitor cancer recurrence. Studies using Maintrac have shown that EpCAM positive cells can be found in the blood in patient without cancer. Inflammatory conditions like Crohn's disease also show increased levels of EpCAM-positive cells. Patients with severe skin burns can also carry EpCAM positive cells in the blood. Therefore, the use of EpCAM-positive cells as a tool for early diagnosis is not optimal.

=== Physical methods ===
Physical methods are often filter-based, enabling the capture of CTCs by size rather than by specific epitopes.

==== ScreenCell ====
ScreenCell is a French filtration technology that enables the simple and rapid isolation (less than 10 minutes) of circulating tumor cells (CTCs) from human whole blood. After a simple peripheral blood collection, the sample can be processed within 4 hours to 3 days using one of the ScreenCell devices.

The isolated tumor cells retain their morphology and integrity, making them directly usable for a wide range of cytology, molecular biology, and cell culture analyses, directly on the isolation support, on a slide, or in suspension.

==== Parsortix method ====
The Parsortix method separates CTCs based on their size and deformability.

=== Hybrid methods ===
Hybrid methods combine physical separation (by gradients, magnetic fields, etc.) with antibody-mediated cell retrieval. An example of this is a sensitive double gradient centrifugation and magnetic cell sorting detection and enumeration method which has been used to detect circulating epithelial cancer cells in breast cancer patients by negative selection. The principle of negative selection is based on the retrieval of all blood cells by using a panel of antibodies as well as traditional gradient centrifugation with Ficoll. A similar method known as ISET Test has been employed to detect circulating prostate cancer cells and another technique known as RosetteStep has been used to isolate CTCs from small-cell lung cancer patients. Similarly, researchers at Massachusetts General Hospital have developed a negative selection method which employs inertial focusing on a microfluidic device. The technique, called CTC-iChip, first removes cells too small to be CTCs, such as red blood cells, and then uses magnetic particles to remove white blood cells.

== CTC characterization ==
Some drugs are particularly effective against cancers which fit certain requirements. For example, Herceptin is very effective in patients who are Her2 positive, but much less effective in patients who are Her2 negative. Once the primary tumor is removed, biopsy of the current state of the cancer through traditional tissue typing is not possible anymore. Often tissue sections of the primary tumor, removed years prior, are used to do the typing. Further characterization of CTC may help determining the current tumor phenotype. FISH assays have been performed on CTC as well as determination of IGF-1R, Her2, Bcl-2, ERG, PTEN, AR status using immunofluorescence. Single cell level qPCR can also be performed with the CTCs isolated from blood.

The organ tropism of patient-derived CTC has been investigated in a mouse model. CTCs isolated from breast cancer patients and expanded in vitro showed they could generate bone, lung, ovary and brain metastases in mice, partially reflecting the secondary lesions as found in the corresponding patients. Remarkably, one CTC line—isolated long before the appearance of brain metastasis in patient—was highly competent to generate brain metastasis in mice. This was the first predictive case for brain metastasis and a proof of concept that intrinsic molecular features of metastatic precursors amongst CTCs could provide novel insights into the mechanisms of metastasis.

=== Cell morphology ===
Morphological appearance is judged by human operators and is therefore subject to large inter operator variation. Several CTC enumeration methods exist which use morphological appearance to identify CTC, which may also apply different morphological criteria. A recent study in prostate cancer showed that many different morphological definitions of circulating tumor cells have similar prognostic value, even though the absolute number of cells found in patients and normal donors varied by more than a decade between different morphological definitions.

== History ==
CTCs were observed for the first time in 1869 in the blood of a man with metastatic cancer by Thomas Ashworth, who postulated that "cells identical with those of the cancer itself being seen in the blood may tend to throw some light upon the mode of origin of multiple tumours existing in the same person". A thorough comparison of the morphology of the circulating cells to tumor cells from different lesions led Ashworth to conclude that "One thing is certain, that if they [CTC] came from an existing cancer structure, they must have passed through the greater part of the circulatory system to have arrived at the internal saphena vein of the sound leg".

The importance of CTCs in modern cancer research began in the mid 1990s with the demonstration that CTCs exist early on in the course of the disease. Those results were made possible by exquisitely sensitive magnetic separation technology employing ferrofluids (colloidal magnetic nanoparticles) and high gradient magnetic separators invented by Paul Liberti and motivated by theoretical calculations by Liberti and Leon Terstappen that indicated very small tumors shedding cells at less than 1.0% per day should result in detectable cells in blood. A variety of other technologies have been applied to CTC enumeration and identification since that time.

Modern cancer research has demonstrated that CTCs derive from clones in the primary tumor, validating Ashworth's remarks. The significant efforts put into understanding the CTCs biological properties have demonstrated the critical role circulating tumor cells play in the metastatic spread of carcinoma. Furthermore, highly sensitive, single-cell analysis demonstrated a high level of heterogeneity seen at the single cell level for both protein expression and protein localization and the CTCs reflected both the primary biopsy and the changes seen in the metastatic sites.
