= Rosandra N. Kaplan =

American pediatric oncologist and scientist

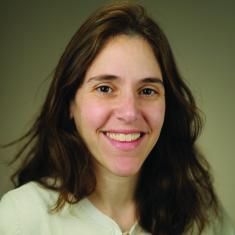
- Born: Rosandra Reich
- Education: Dartmouth Medical School (MD)
- Scientific career
- Fields: Pediatric hematology and oncology, clinical research
- Workplaces: Weill Cornell Medicine; Memorial Sloan Kettering Cancer Center; National Cancer Institute

Rosandra N. Kaplan (née Reich) is an American pediatric oncologist and scientist specialized in translational and clinical research on the mechanisms of cancer spread and the role of the tumor microenvironment in cancer progression. She is a principal investigator and head of the tumor microenvironment and metastasis branch at the National Cancer Institute.

== Education ==
Kaplan completed a medical degree from Dartmouth Medical School. She completed her pediatric residency training at Boston Children's Hospital and Boston Medical Center. Following residency Kaplan pursued a fellowship in pediatric hematology and oncology at Memorial Sloan-Kettering Cancer Center and Weill Cornell Medical Center, where she served as chief fellow. She did her postdoctoral research work in the laboratory of David Lyden where they discovered the concept of the Pre-metastatic niche - Wikipedia.

== Career and research ==
Kaplan was appointed assistant professor at Weill Cornell Medical College and assistant member at Memorial Sloan Kettering Cancer Center in 2006. In the fall of 2010, she joined the Pediatric Oncology Branch of the National Cancer Institute (NCI). She is a clinician and physician scientist with active translational and clinical research interests focused on the tumor and metastatic microenvironment and mechanism of cancer spread. Kaplan developed the concept of the Pre-Metastatic Niche describing the changes in distant microenvironments in response to a growing tumor that create a niche environment conducive to disseminating tumor cell survival and growth resulting in clinically relevant metastasis. Kaplan's research program focuses on developing novel biomarkers and therapeutic approaches to modulate the metastatic microenvironment. She is a pioneer in the field of tumor microenvironment and metastasis and has extensive experience in cell therapy in solid tumors. Dr. Kaplan and her lab developed Genetically Engineered Myeloid cells (affectionately referred to as GEMys that can deliver cargo locally to reprogram the immune suppressive tumor and metastatic microenvironment. The promising preclinical work has led to clinical trial development.
