= Urogenital pelvic malignancy =

A urogenital pelvic malignancy is a regional lymph node involvement in urogenital malignancies (category N in the TNM classification system) is a significant radiologic finding, with important implications for treatment and prognosis. Male urogenital pelvic cancers commonly spread to iliopelvic or retroperitoneal lymph nodes by following pathways of normal lymphatic drainage from the pelvic organs. The most likely pathway of nodal spread (superficial inguinal, pelvic, or paraaortic) depends on the tumour location in the prostate, penis, testes, or bladder and whether surgery or other therapy has disrupted normal lymphatic drainage from the tumour site; knowledge of both factors is needed for accurate disease staging. At present, lymph node status is most often assessed with standard anatomic imaging techniques such as multidetector computed tomography or magnetic resonance imaging (MRI). However, the detection of nodal disease with these techniques is reliant on lymph node size and morphological characteristics, criteria that provide limited diagnostic specificity. Functional imaging techniques, such as diffusion-weighted MRI performed with or without a lymphotropic contrast agent and positron emission tomography, may allow a more accurate nodal assessment based on molecular or physiologic activity.
