= Metastasis =

Spreading of a disease inside a body

- Other names: Metastatic disease
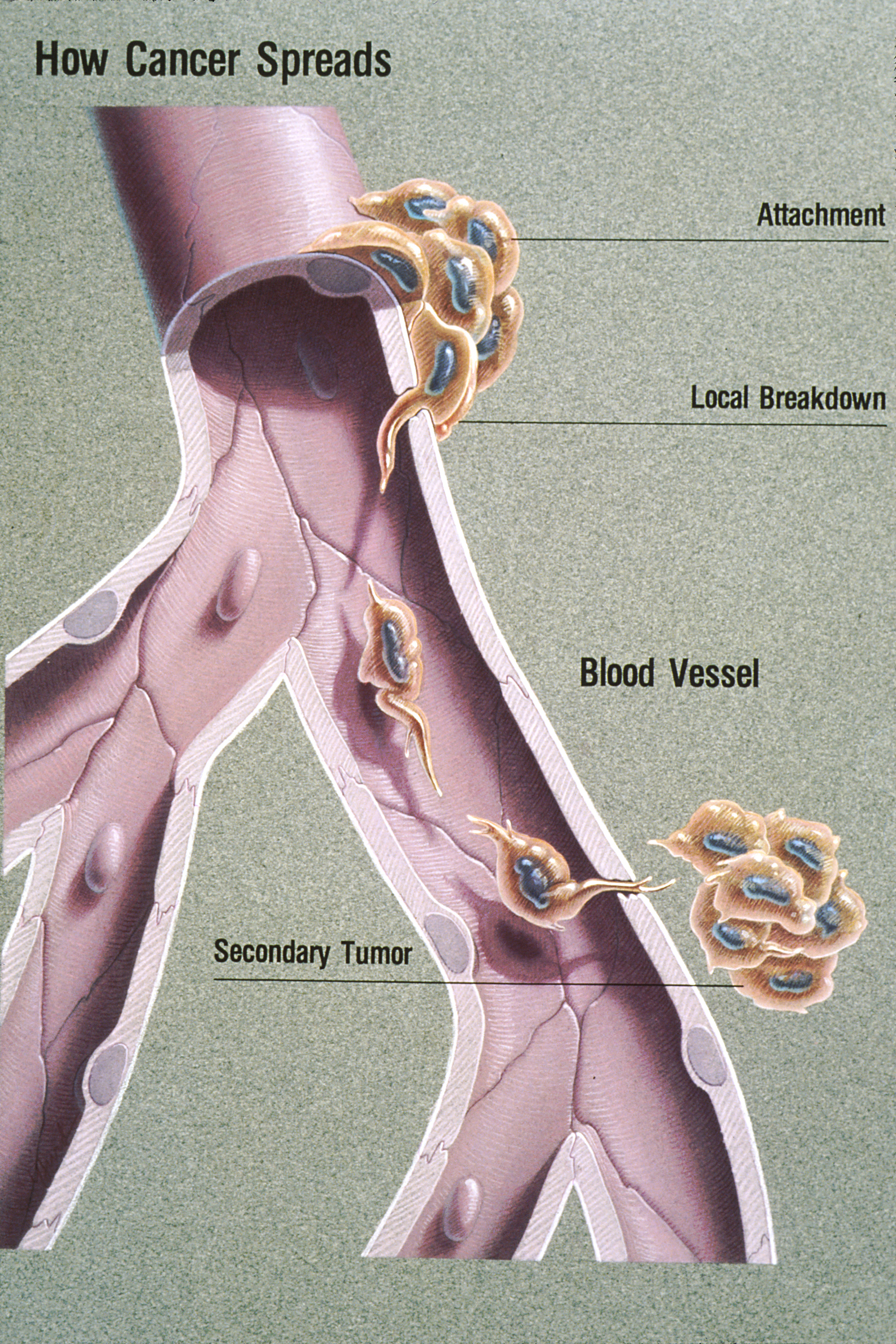
- Illustration showing hematogenous metastasis
- Pronunciation: /məˈtæstəsɪs/ pl. metastases (/məˈtæstəsiːz/)
- Specialty: Oncology

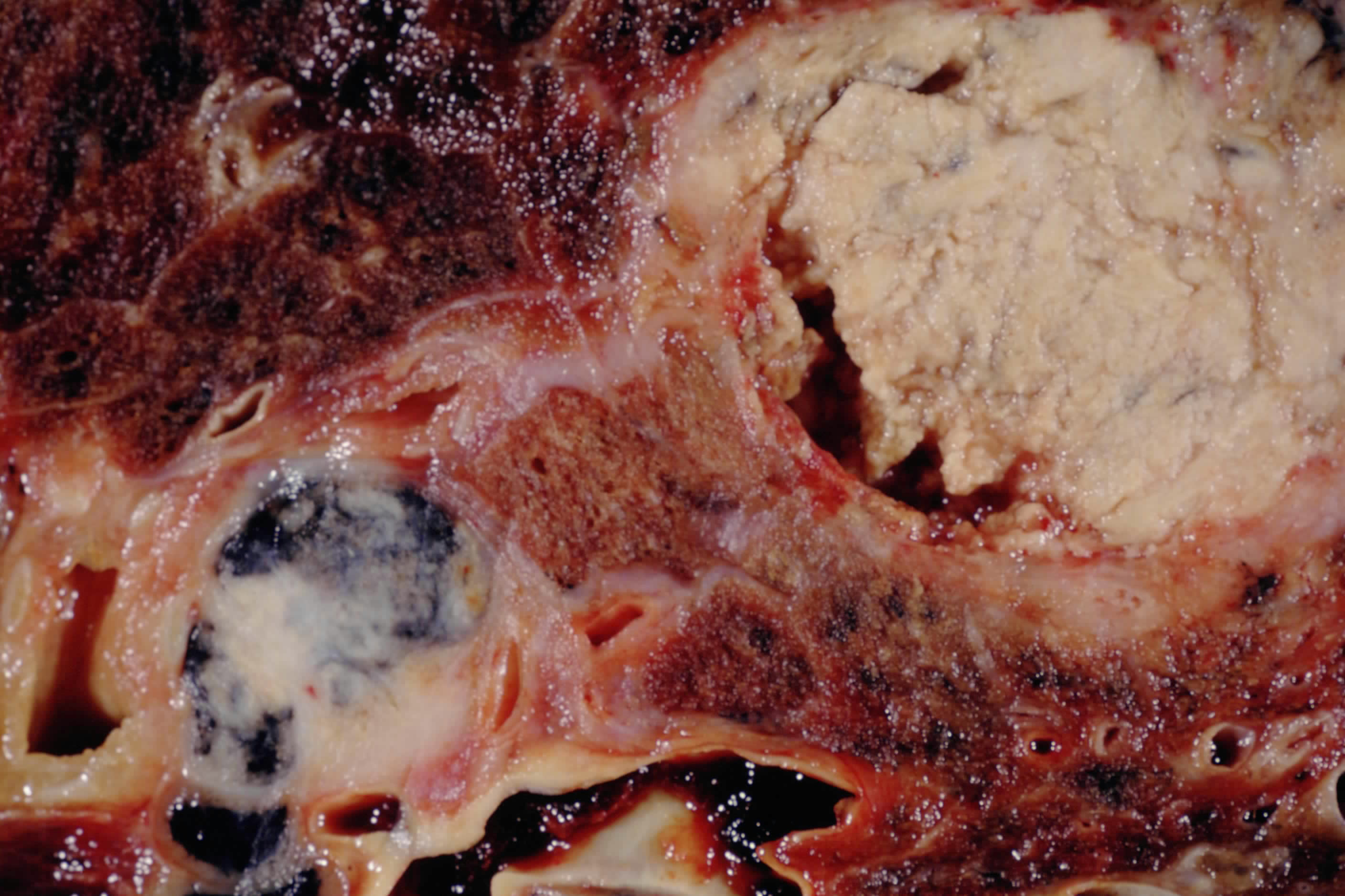
Squamous cell carcinoma occluding bronchus with metastasis to adjacent lymph node

Metastasis is the spread of a pathogenic agent from an initial or primary site to a different or secondary site within the host's body; the term is typically used when referring to metastasis by a cancerous tumor. The newly pathological sites, then, are metastases (mets). It is generally distinguished from cancer invasion, which is the direct extension and penetration by cancer cells into neighboring tissues.

Cancer occurs after cells are genetically altered to proliferate rapidly and indefinitely. This uncontrolled proliferation by mitosis produces a primary heterogeneic tumor. The cells which constitute the tumor eventually undergo metaplasia, followed by dysplasia then anaplasia, resulting in a malignant phenotype. This malignancy allows for invasion into the circulation, followed by invasion to a second site for tumorigenesis.

Some cancer cells, known as circulating tumor cells (CTCs), are able to penetrate the walls of lymphatic or blood vessels, and circulate through the bloodstream to other sites and tissues in the body. This process, known respectively as lymphatic or hematogenous spread, allows not only single cells but also groups of cells, or CTC clusters, to travel. Evidence suggests that CTC clusters may retain their multicellular configuration throughout metastasis, enhancing their ability to establish secondary tumors. This perspective aligns with the cancer exodus hypothesis, which posits that maintaining this cluster structure contributes to a higher metastatic potential. Metastasis is one of the hallmarks of cancer, distinguishing it from benign tumors. Most cancers can metastasize, although in varying degrees. Basal cell carcinoma for example rarely metastasizes.

When tumor cells metastasize, the new tumor is called a secondary or metastatic tumor, and its cells are similar to those in the original or primary tumor. This means that if breast cancer metastasizes to the lungs, the secondary tumor is made up of abnormal breast cells, not of abnormal lung cells. The tumor in the lung is then called metastatic breast cancer, not lung cancer. Metastasis is a key element in cancer staging systems such as the TNM staging system, where it represents the "M". In overall stage grouping, metastasis places a cancer in Stage IV. The possibilities of curative treatment are greatly reduced, or often entirely removed when a cancer has metastasized.

== Signs and symptoms ==
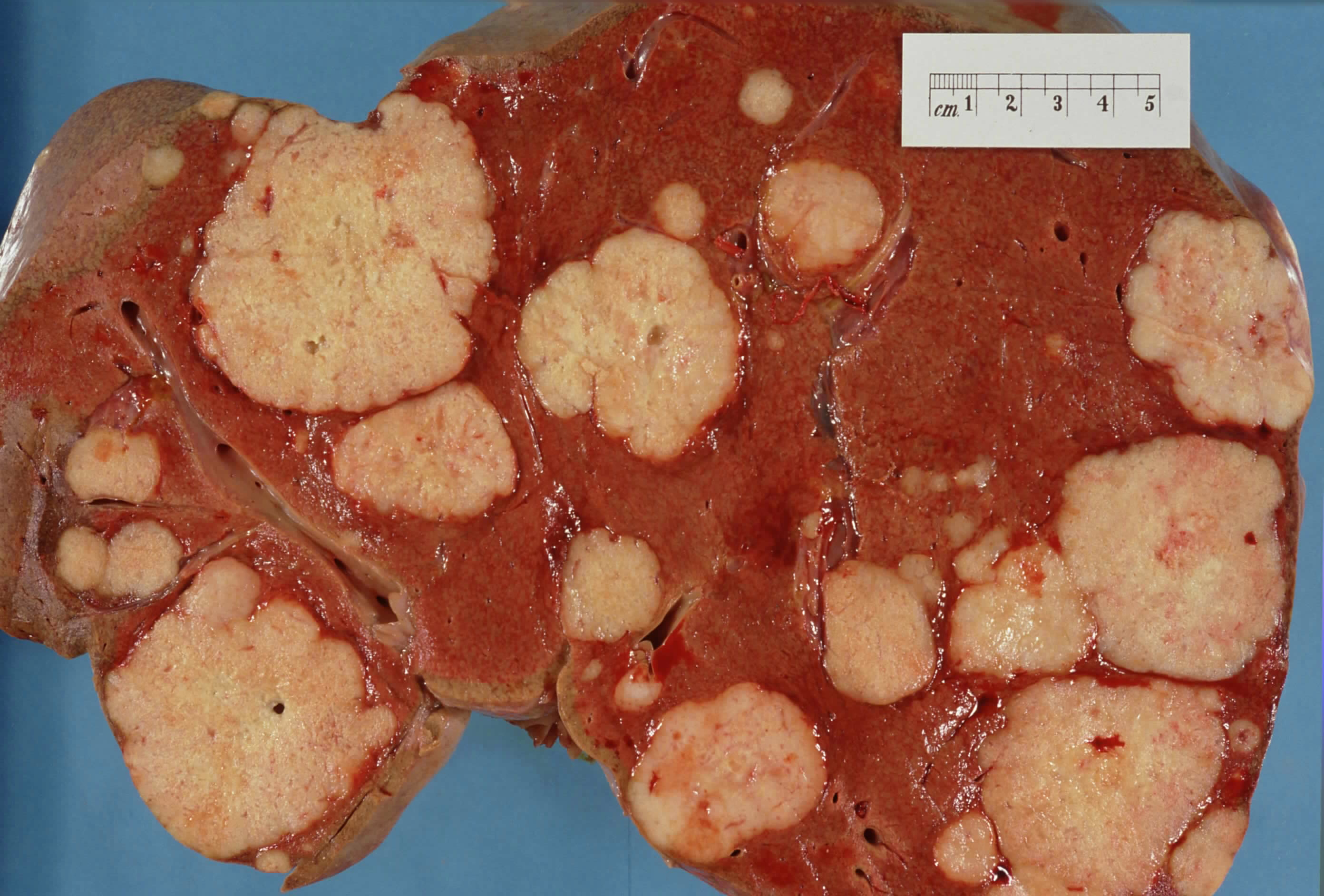
Cut surface of a liver showing multiple paler metastatic nodules originating from pancreatic cancer

Initially, nearby lymph nodes are struck early. The lungs, liver, brain, and bones are the most common metastasis locations from solid tumors.

- In lymph node metastasis, a common symptom is lymphadenopathy
- Lung metastasis: cough, hemoptysis and dyspnea (shortness of breath)
- Liver metastasis: hepatomegaly (enlarged liver), nausea and jaundice
- Bone metastasis: bone pain, fracture of affected bones
- Brain metastasis: neurological symptoms such as headaches, seizures, and vertigo

Although advanced cancer may cause pain, it is often not the first symptom.

Some patients, however, do not show any symptoms.

== Pathophysiology ==
Metastatic tumors are very common in the late stages of cancer. The spread of metastasis may occur via the blood or the lymphatics or through both routes. The most common sites of metastases are the lungs, liver, brain, and the bones.

Currently, three main theories have been proposed to explain the metastatic pathway of cancer: the epithelial-mesenchymal transition (EMT) and mesenchymal-epithelial transition (MET) hypothesis, the cancer stem cell hypothesis, and the macrophage–cancer cell fusion hybrid hypothesis. Some new hypotheses were suggested as well, i.e., under the effect of particular biochemical and/or physical stressors, cancer cells can undergo nuclear expulsion with subsequent macrophage engulfment and fusion, with the formation of cancer fusion cells (CFCs). Understanding the enigma of cancer cell spread to distant sites, which accounts for over 90% of cancer-related deaths, necessitates comprehensive investigation. Key outstanding questions revolve around the survival and migration of cancer cells, such as the nucleus, as they face challenges in passage through capillary valves and hydrodynamic shear forces in the circulation system, making CTCs an unlikely source of metastasis. Moreover, understanding how cancer cells adapt to the metastatic niche and remain dormant (tumor dormancy) for extended periods presents difficult questions that require further investigation.

In addition to genetic and biochemical regulation, mechanical forces and the physical properties of cancer cells and their surrounding microenvironment play an important role across multiple stages of metastasis, including invasion, intravasation, circulation, extravasation, and colonisation.

=== Factors involved ===
Metastasis involves a complex series of steps in which cancer cells leave the original tumor site and migrate to other parts of the body via the bloodstream, via the lymphatic system, or by direct extension. To do so, malignant cells break away from the primary tumor and attach to and degrade proteins that make up the surrounding extracellular matrix (ECM), which separates the tumor from adjoining tissues. By degrading these proteins, cancer cells are able to breach the ECM and escape. The location of the metastases is not always random, with different types of cancer tending to spread to particular organs and tissues at a rate that is higher than expected by statistical chance alone. Breast cancer, for example, tends to metastasize to the bones and lungs. This specificity seems to be mediated by soluble signal molecules such as chemokines and transforming growth factor beta. The body resists metastasis by a variety of mechanisms through the actions of a class of proteins known as metastasis suppressors, of which about a dozen are known.

Human cells exhibit different kinds of motion: collective motility, mesenchymal-type movement, and amoeboid movement. Cancer cells often opportunistically switch between different kinds of motion. Some cancer researchers hope to find treatments that can stop or at least slow down the spread of cancer by somehow blocking some necessary step in one or more kinds of motion.

All steps of the metastatic cascade involve a number of physical processes. Cell migration requires the generation of forces, and when cancer cells transmigrate through the vasculature, this requires physical gaps in the blood vessels to form. Besides forces, the regulation of various types of cell-cell and cell-matrix adhesions is crucial during metastasis.

The metastatic steps are critically regulated by various cell types, including the blood vessel cells (endothelial cells), immune cells or stromal cells. The growth of a new network of blood vessels, called tumor angiogenesis, is a crucial hallmark of cancer. It has therefore been suggested that angiogenesis inhibitors would prevent the growth of metastases. Endothelial progenitor cells have been shown to have a strong influence on metastasis and angiogenesis. Endothelial progenitor cells are important in tumor growth, angiogenesis and metastasis, and can be marked using the Inhibitor of DNA Binding 1 (ID1). This novel finding meant that investigators gained the ability to track endothelial progenitor cells from the bone marrow to the blood to the tumor-stroma and even incorporated in tumor vasculature. Endothelial progenitor cells incorporated in tumor vasculature suggests that this cell type in blood-vessel development is important in a tumor setting and metastasis. Furthermore, ablation of the endothelial progenitor cells in the bone marrow can lead to a significant decrease in tumor growth and vasculature development. Therefore, endothelial progenitor cells are important in tumor biology and present novel therapeutic targets. The immune system is typically deregulated in cancer and affects many stages of tumor progression, including metastasis.

Epigenetic regulation also plays an important role in the metastatic outgrowth of disseminated tumor cells. Metastases display alterations in histone modifications, such as H3K4-methylation and H3K9-methylation, when compared to matching primary tumors. These epigenetic modifications in metastases may allow the proliferation and survival of disseminated tumor cells in distant organs.

A recent study shows that PKC-iota promotes melanoma cell invasion by activating Vimentin during EMT. PKC-iota inhibition or knockdown resulted in an increase in E-cadherin and RhoA levels while decreasing total Vimentin, phosphorylated Vimentin (S39) and Par6 in metastatic melanoma cells. These results suggested that PKC-ι is involved in signaling pathways which upregulate EMT in melanoma thereby directly stimulates metastasis.

Recently, a series of high-profile experiments suggests that the co-option of intercellular cross-talk mediated by exosome vesicles is a critical factor involved in all steps of the invasion-metastasis cascade.

=== Routes ===
Metastasis occurs by the following four routes:

==== Transcoelomic ====
The spread of a malignancy into body cavities can occur via penetrating the surface of the peritoneal (called peritoneal carcinomatosis), pleural, pericardial, or subarachnoid spaces. For example, ovarian tumors can spread transperitoneally to the surface of the liver.

==== Lymphatic spread ====
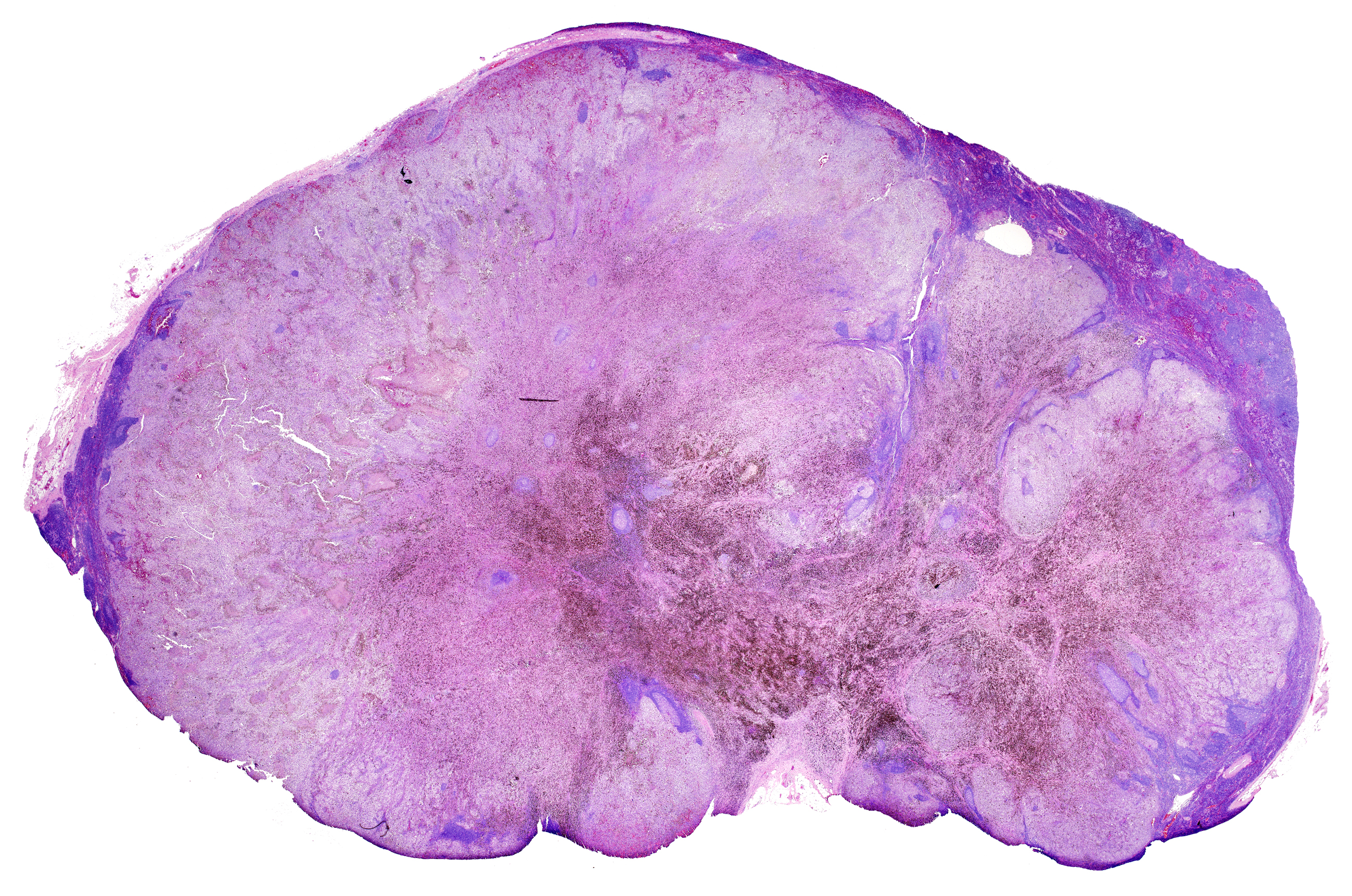
Lymph node with almost complete replacement by metastatic melanoma. The brown pigment is focal deposition of melanin.

Lymphatic spread allows the transport of tumor cells to regional lymph nodes near the primary tumor and ultimately, to other parts of the body. This is called nodal involvement, positive nodes, or regional disease. "Positive nodes" is a term that would be used by medical specialists to describe regional lymph nodes that tested positive for malignancy. It is common medical practice to test by biopsy at least one lymph node near a tumor site when carrying out surgery to examine or remove a tumor. This lymph node is then called a sentinel lymph node. Lymphatic spread is the most common route of initial metastasis for carcinomas. In contrast, it is uncommon for a sarcoma to metastasize via this route. Localized spread to regional lymph nodes near the primary tumor is not normally counted as a metastasis, although this is a sign of a worse prognosis (outcome). The lymphatic system does eventually drain from the thoracic duct and right lymphatic duct into the systemic venous system at the venous angle and into the brachiocephalic veins, and therefore these metastatic cells can also eventually spread through the haematogenous route.

For example, spread of cancer from the vulva, clitoris and Bartholin glands involved lymphatogenous metastasis. As these other more superficial cancers grow deeper into the surrounding tissue, the risk of lymphatogenous metastasis increases. Vulvar cancers spread primarily to the inguinofemoral lymph nodes. From these lymph nodes, cancer can spread to the pelvic lymph nodes. If the depth of the cancer on the vulva, clitoris or Bartholin gland is less than 1 mm, lymphatogenous metastasis is relatively unlikely. When the growth is between 1 and 3 mm in depth, the risk of lymphatogenous metastasis approaches 8%. At the depths of more than 3 mm, the involvement of lymph nodes is expected in at least 20% of the time. Risk continues to increase along with the possibility of contralateral metastasis. Other growth characteristics influence risk of the spread such as the mass of the original growth, the initial location. Operation techniques. Vulvar cancer at Stage IVA will involve the lymph nodes. Traditionally, large amounts of tissue were removed in a 'radical vulvectomy'. This involved the removal of the entire vulva and the inguinofemoral lymph nodes on both sides with what was termed a “butterfly” incision. Patient survival was correlated to this surgery, sometimes described as "mutilating". In the past two decades individual treatment plans have replaced the standardized "butterfly" surgical techniques. Removal of the inguinofemoral lymph nodes is done separately from the vulvectomy.

==== Hematogenous spread ====
This is typical route of metastasis for sarcomas, but it is also the favored route for certain types of carcinoma, such as renal cell carcinoma originating in the kidney and follicular carcinomas of the thyroid. Because of their thinner walls, veins are more frequently invaded than are arteries, and metastasis tends to follow the pattern of venous flow. That is, hematogenous spread often follows distinct patterns depending on the location of the primary tumor. For example, colorectal cancer spreads primarily through the portal vein to the liver.

==== Canalicular spread ====
Some tumors, especially carcinomas may metastasize along anatomical canalicular spaces. These spaces include for example the bile ducts, the urinary system, the airways and the subarachnoid space. The process is similar to that of transcoelomic spread. However, often it remains unclear whether simultaneously diagnosed tumors of a canalicular system are one metastatic process or in fact independent tumors caused by the same agent (field cancerization).

=== Organ-specific targets ===
Main sites of metastases for some common cancer types. Primary cancers are denoted by "...cancer" and their main metastasis sites are denoted by "...metastases".

There is a propensity for certain tumors to seed in particular organs. This was first discussed as the seed and soil theory by Stephen Paget in 1889. The propensity for a metastatic cell to spread to a particular organ is termed 'organotropism'. For example, prostate cancer usually metastasizes to the bones. In a similar manner, colon cancer has a tendency to metastasize to the liver.

According to the seed and soil theory, it is difficult for cancer cells to survive outside their region of origin, so in order to metastasize they must find a location with similar characteristics. For example, breast tumor cells, which gather calcium ions from breast milk, metastasize to bone tissue, where they can gather calcium ions from bone. Melanoma spreads to the brain, presumably because neural tissue and melanocytes arise from the same cell line in the embryo.

In 1928, James Ewing challenged the seed and soil theory, and proposed that metastasis occurs purely by anatomic and mechanical routes. This hypothesis has been recently utilized to suggest several hypotheses about the life cycle of circulating tumor cells (CTCs) and to postulate that the patterns of spread could be better understood through a 'filter and flow' perspective. However, contemporary evidences indicate that the primary tumor may dictate organotropic metastases by inducing the formation of pre-metastatic niches at distant sites, where incoming metastatic cells may engraft and colonise. Specifically, exosome vesicles secreted by tumors have been shown to home to pre-metastatic sites, where they activate pro-metastatic processes such as angiogenesis and modify the immune contexture, so as to foster a favorable microenvironment for secondary tumor growth.

=== Metastasis and primary cancer ===
It is theorized that metastasis always coincides with a primary cancer, and, as such, is a tumor that started from a cancer cell or cells in another part of the body. However, over 10% of patients presenting to oncology units will have metastases without a primary tumor found. In these cases, doctors refer to the primary tumor as "unknown" or "occult", and the patient is said to have cancer of unknown primary origin (CUP) or unknown primary tumors (UPT). It is estimated that 3% of all cancers are of unknown primary origin. Studies have shown that, if simple questioning does not reveal the cancer's source (coughing up blood—"probably lung", urinating blood—"probably bladder"), complex imaging will not either. In some of these cases a primary tumor may appear later.

The use of immunohistochemistry has permitted pathologists to give an identity to many of these metastases. However, imaging of the indicated area only occasionally reveals a primary. In rare cases (e.g., of melanoma), no primary tumor is found, even on autopsy. It is therefore thought that some primary tumors can regress completely, but leave their metastases behind. In other cases, the tumor might just be too small and/or in an unusual location to be diagnosed.

== Diagnosis ==
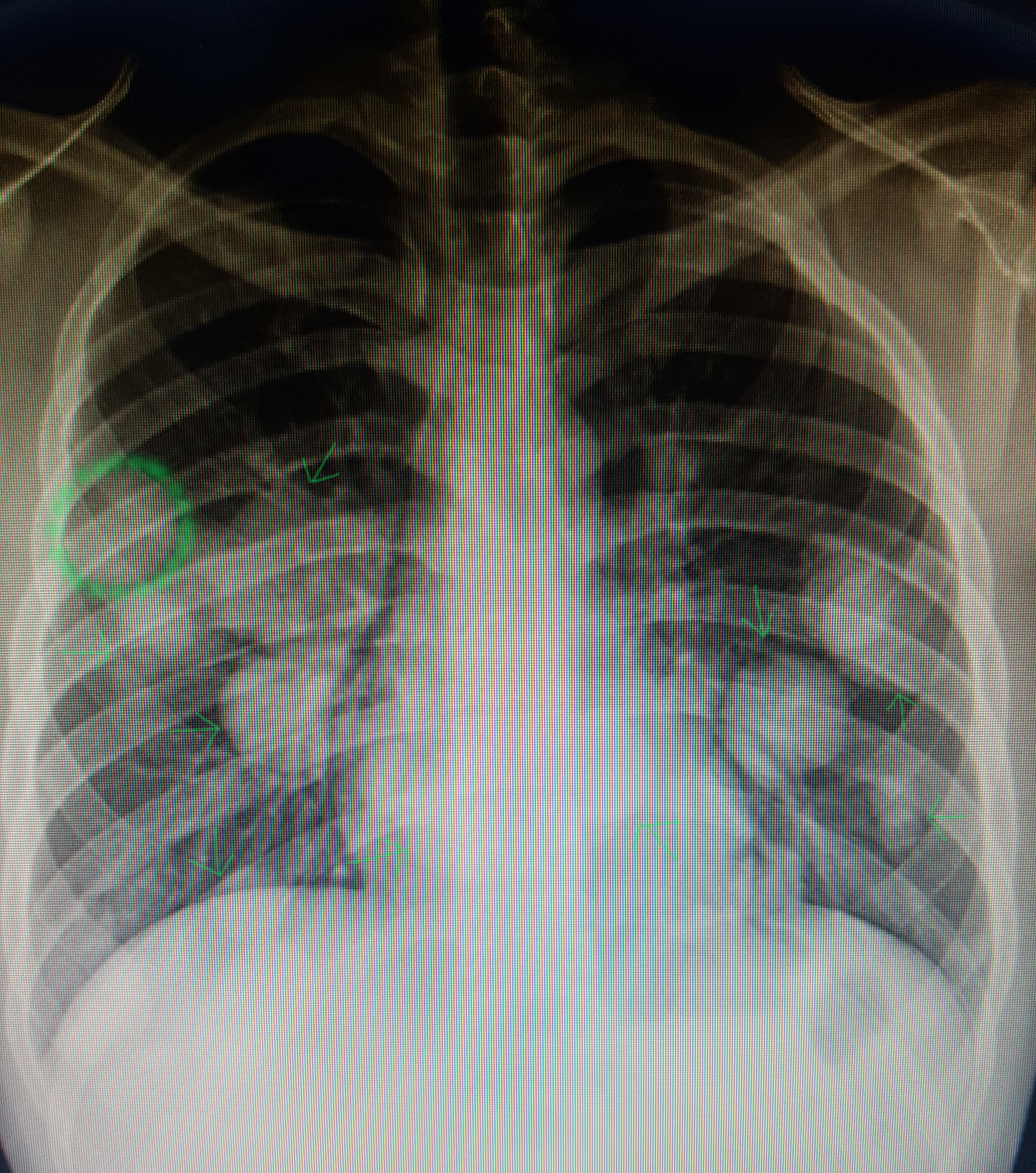
Pulmonary metastases shown on Chest X-Ray

The cells in a metastatic tumor resemble those in the primary tumor. Once the cancerous tissue is examined under a microscope to determine the cell type, a doctor can usually tell whether that type of cell is normally found in the part of the body from which the tissue sample was taken.

For instance, breast cancer cells look the same whether they are found in the breast or have spread to another part of the body. So, if a tissue sample taken from a tumor in the lung contains cells that look like breast cells, the doctor determines that the lung tumor is a secondary tumor. Still, the determination of the primary tumor can often be very difficult, and the pathologist may have to use several adjuvant techniques, such as immunohistochemistry, FISH (fluorescent in situ hybridization), and others. Despite the use of techniques, in some cases the primary tumor remains unidentified.

Metastatic cancers may be found at the same time as the primary tumor, or months or years later. When a second tumor is found in a patient that has been treated for cancer in the past, it is more often a metastasis than another primary tumor.

It was previously thought that most cancer cells have a low metastatic potential and that there are rare cells that develop the ability to metastasize through the development of somatic mutations. According to this theory, diagnosis of metastatic cancers is only possible after the event of metastasis. Traditional means of diagnosing cancer (e.g. a biopsy) would only investigate a subpopulation of the cancer cells and would very likely not sample from the subpopulation with metastatic potential.

The somatic mutation theory of metastasis development has not been substantiated in human cancers. Rather, it seems that the genetic state of the primary tumor reflects the ability of that cancer to metastasize. Research comparing gene expression between primary and metastatic adenocarcinomas identified a subset of genes whose expression could distinguish primary tumors from metastatic tumors, dubbed a "metastatic signature". Up-regulated genes in the signature include: SNRPF, HNRPAB, DHPS and securin. Actin, myosin and MHC class II down-regulation was also associated with the signature. Additionally, the metastatic-associated expression of these genes was also observed in some primary tumors, indicating that cells with the potential to metastasize could be identified concurrently with diagnosis of the primary tumor. Recent work identified a form of genetic instability in cancer called chromosome instability (CIN) as a driver of metastasis. In aggressive cancer cells, loose DNA fragments from unstable chromosomes spill in the cytosol leading to the chronic activation of innate immune pathways, which are hijacked by cancer cells to spread to distant organs.

Expression of this metastatic signature has been correlated with a poor prognosis and has been shown to be consistent in several types of cancer. Prognosis was shown to be worse for individuals whose primary tumors expressed the metastatic signature. Additionally, the expression of these metastatic-associated genes was shown to apply to other cancer types in addition to adenocarcinoma. Metastases of breast cancer, medulloblastoma and prostate cancer all had similar expression patterns of these metastasis-associated genes.

The identification of this metastasis-associated signature provides promise for identifying cells with metastatic potential within the primary tumor and hope for improving the prognosis of these metastatic-associated cancers. Additionally, identifying the genes whose expression is changed in metastasis offers potential targets to inhibit metastasis.

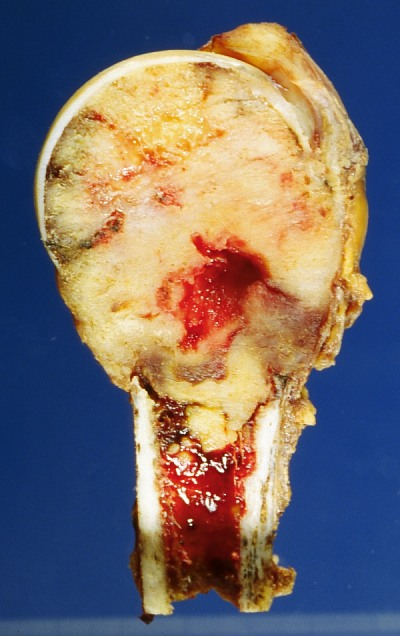
Cut surface of a humerus sawn lengthwise, showing a large cancerous metastasis (the whitish tumor between the head and the shaft of the bone)

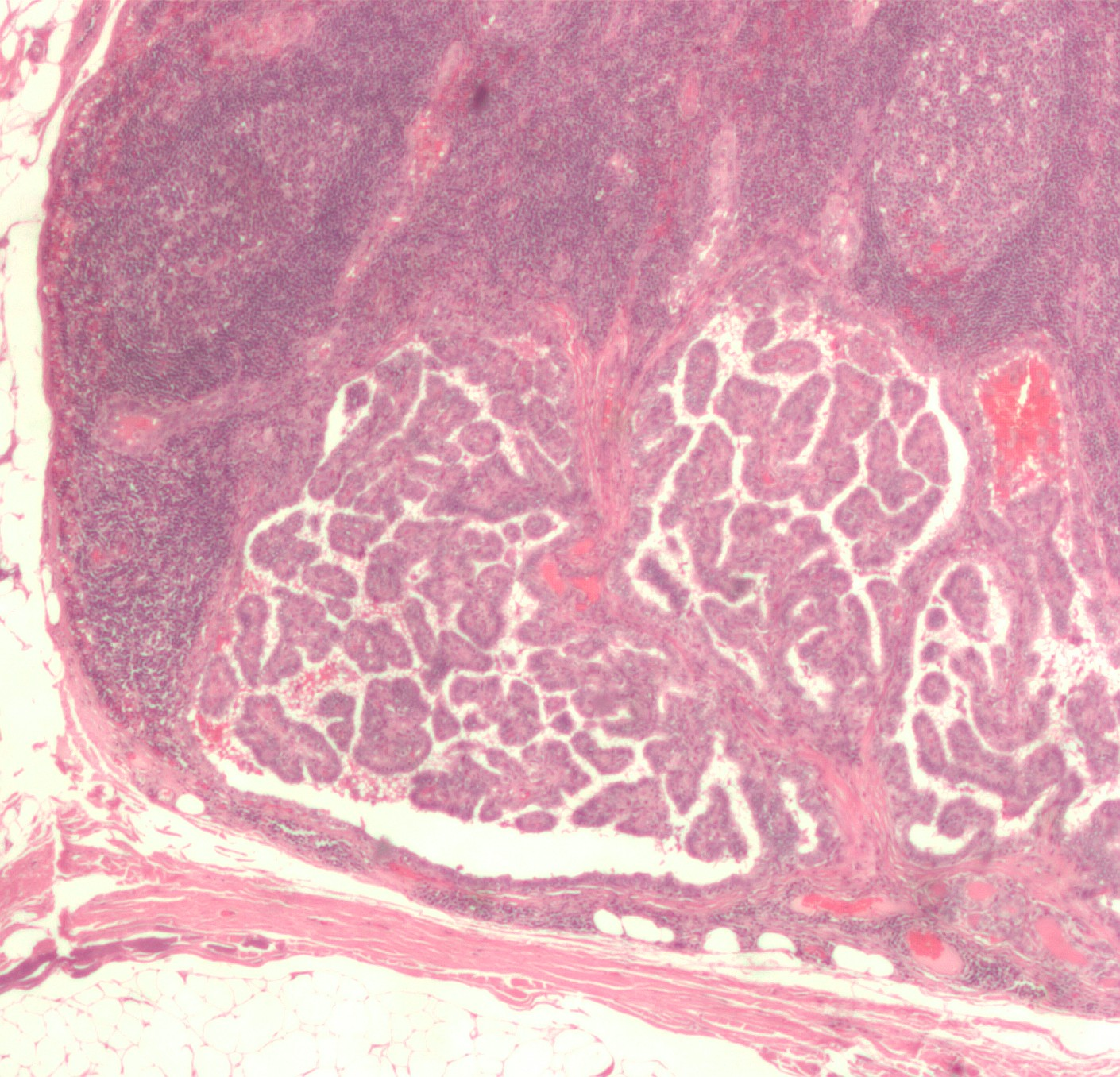
Micrograph of thyroid cancer (papillary thyroid carcinoma) in a lymph node of the neck. H&E stain

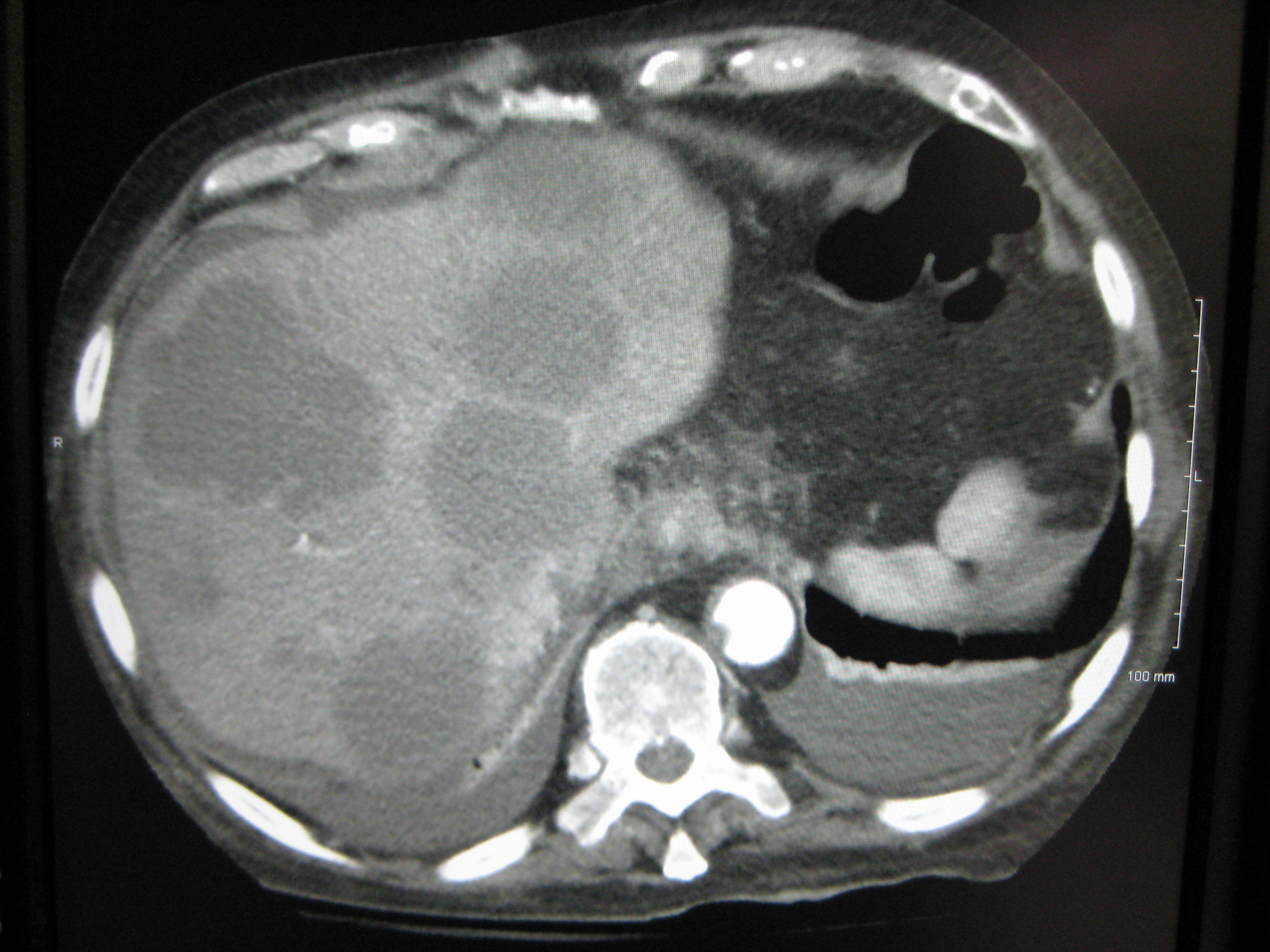
CT image of multiple liver metastases

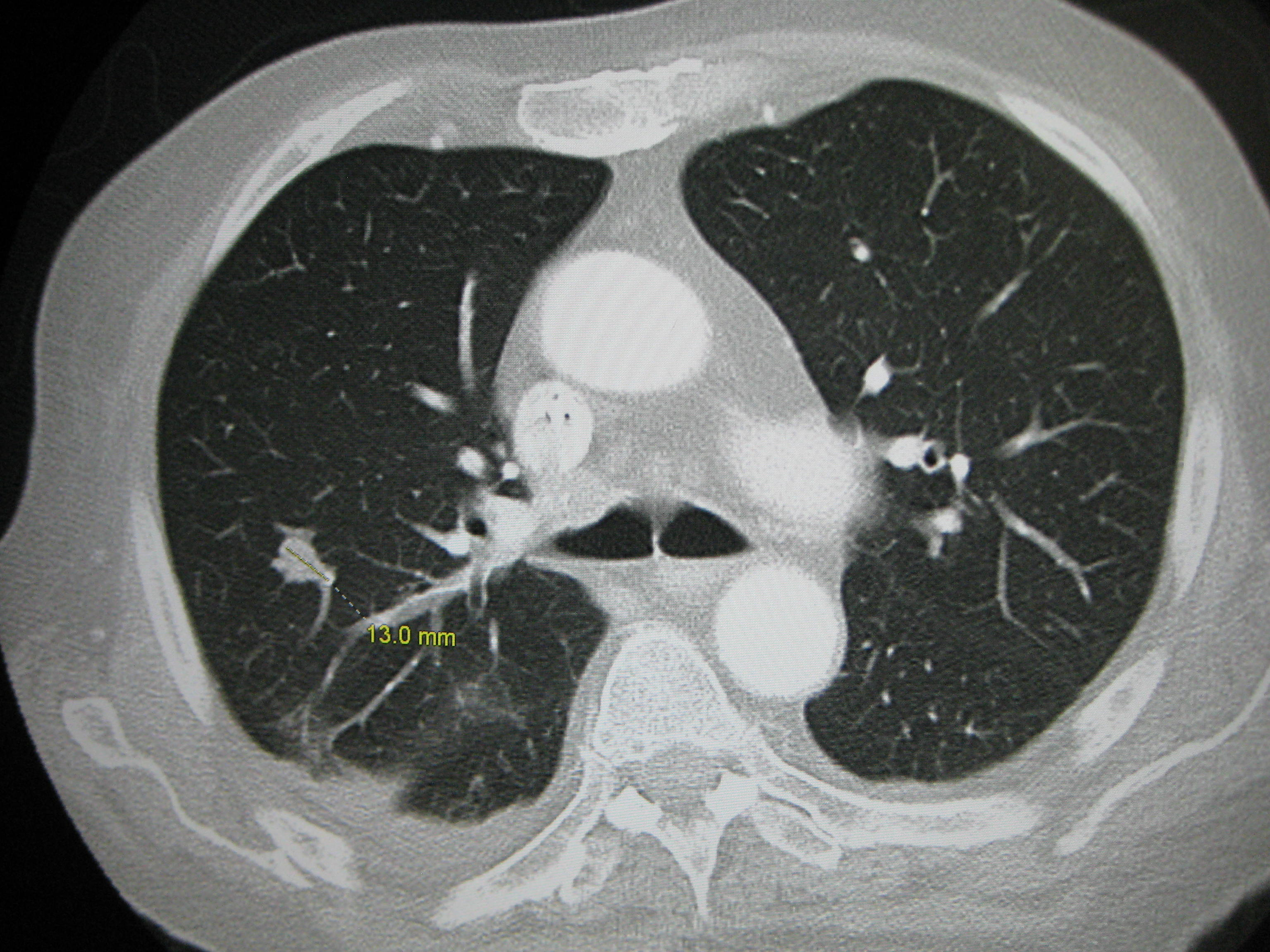
CT image of a lung metastasis

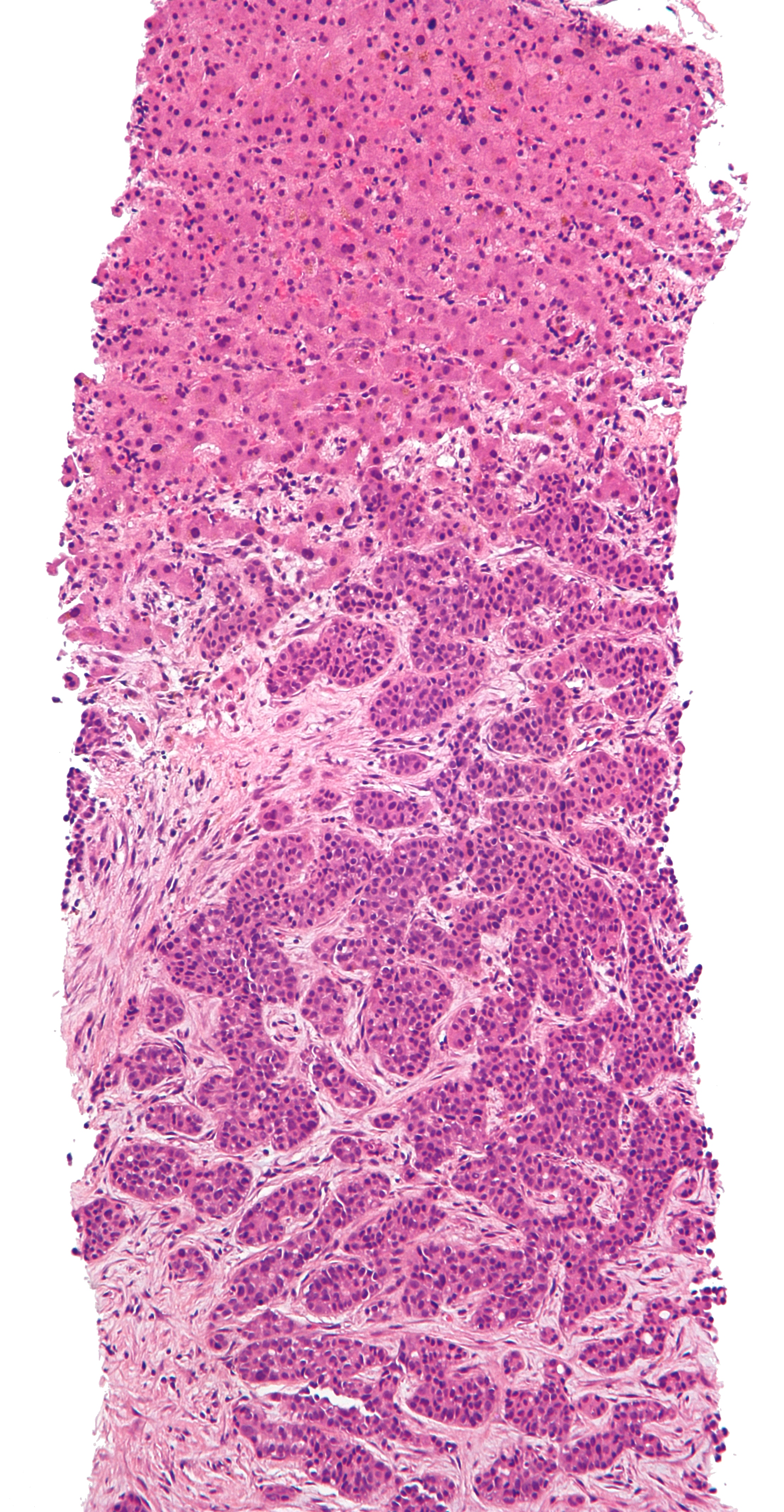
Metastasis proven by liver biopsy (tumor (adenocarcinoma)—lower two-thirds of image). H&E stain.

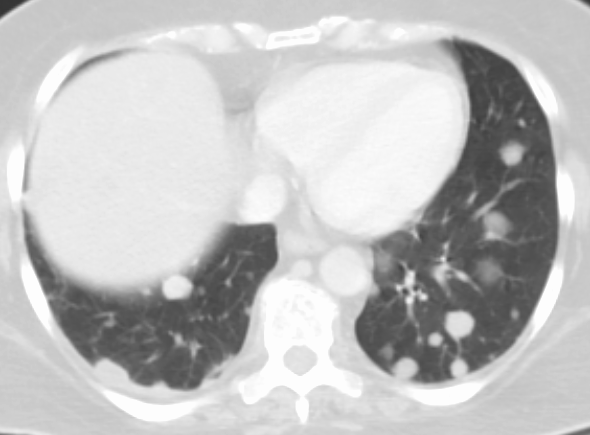
Metastatic cancer in the lungs

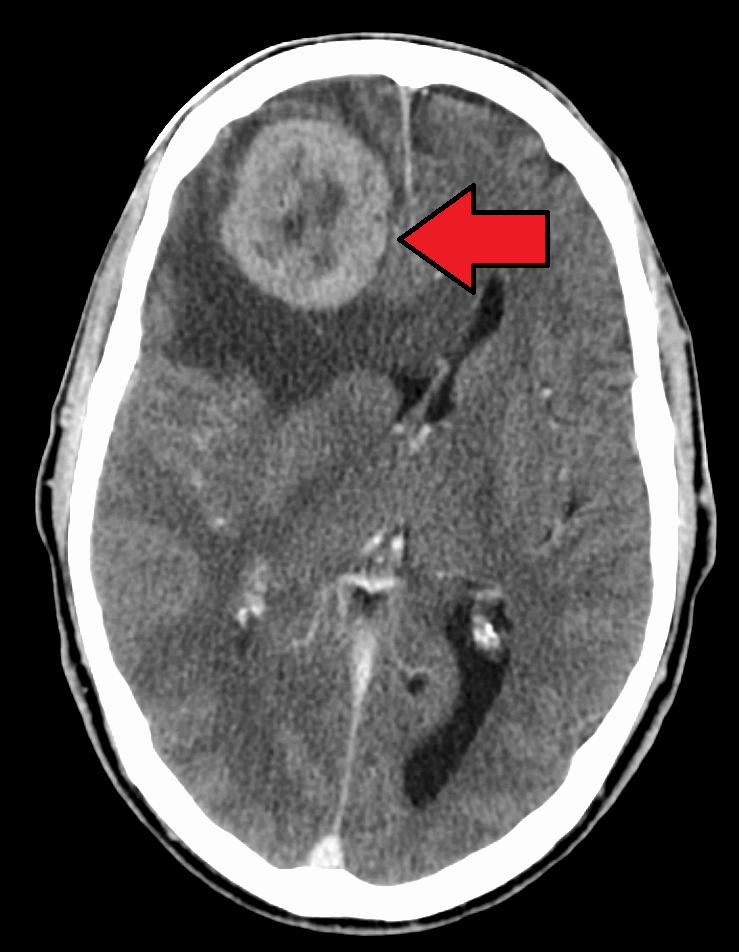
Metastases from the lungs to the brain

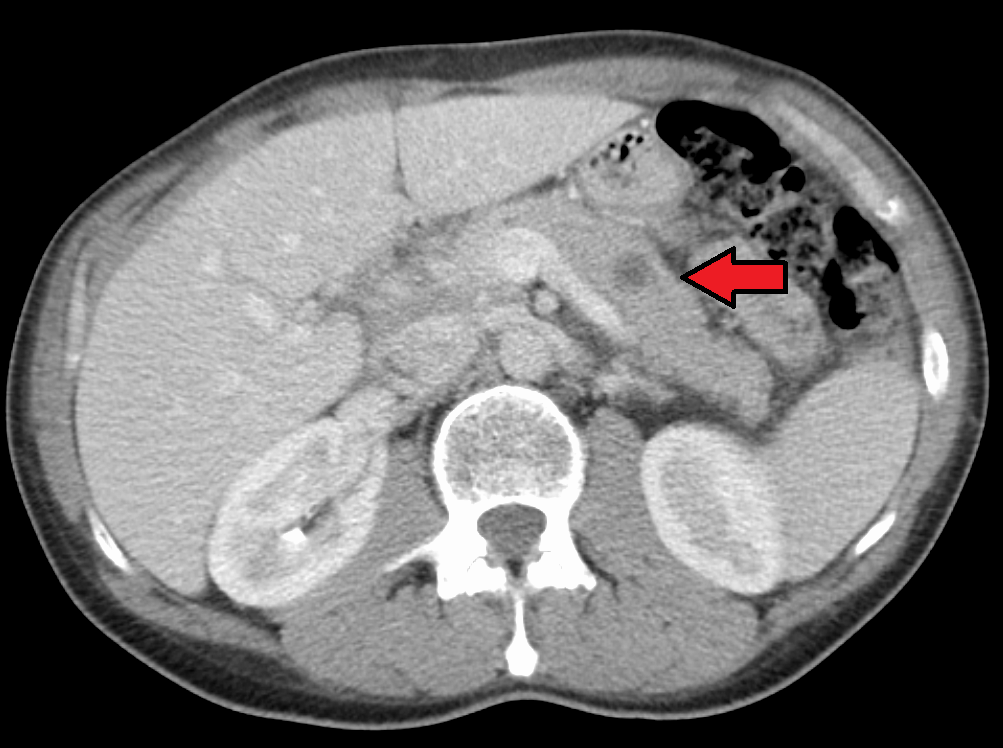
Metastases from the lungs to the pancreas

== Management ==
Treatment and survival is determined, to a great extent, by whether or not a cancer remains localized or spreads to other locations in the body. If the cancer metastasizes to other tissues or organs it usually dramatically increases a patient's likelihood of death. Some cancers—such as some forms of leukemia, a cancer of the blood, or malignancies in the brain—can kill without spreading at all.

Once a cancer has metastasized it may still be treated with radiosurgery, chemotherapy, radiation therapy, biological therapy, hormone therapy, surgery, or a combination of these interventions ("multimodal therapy"). The choice of treatment depends on many factors, including the type of primary cancer, the size and location of the metastases, the patient's age and general health, and the types of treatments used previously. In patients diagnosed with CUP it is often still possible to treat the disease even when the primary tumor cannot be located.

Current treatments are rarely able to cure metastatic cancer though some tumors, such as testicular cancer and thyroid cancer, are usually curable.

Palliative care, care aimed at improving the quality of life of people with major illness, has been recommended as part of management programs for metastasis. Results from a systematic review of the literature on radiation therapy for brain metastases found that there is little evidence to inform comparative effectiveness and Patient-centered outcomes on quality of life, functional status, and cognitive effects.

== Research ==
Although metastasis is widely accepted to be the result of the tumor cells migration, there is a hypothesis saying that some metastases are the result of inflammatory processes by abnormal immune cells. The existence of metastatic cancers in the absence of primary tumors also suggests that metastasis is not always caused by malignant cells that leave primary tumors.

The research done by Sarna's team proved that heavily pigmented melanoma cells have Young's modulus about 4.93, when in non-pigmented ones it was only 0.98. In another experiment they found that elasticity of melanoma cells is important for its metastasis and growth: non-pigmented tumors were bigger than pigmented and it was much easier for them to spread. They showed that there are both pigmented and non-pigmented cells in melanoma tumors, so that they can both be drug-resistant and metastatic.

== History ==
The first physician to report the possibility of local metastasis from a primary cancerous source to nearby tissues was Ibn Sina. He described a case of breast cancer and metastatic condition in The Canon of Medicine. His hypothesis was based on clinical course of the patient.

In March 2014 researchers discovered the oldest complete example of a human with metastatic cancer. The tumors had developed in a 3,000-year-old skeleton found in 2013 in a tomb in Sudan dating back to 1200 BC. The skeleton was analyzed using radiography and a scanning electron microscope. These findings were published in the Public Library of Science journal.

== Etymology ==
Metastasis is an Ancient Greek word (μετάστασις) meaning "displacement", from μετά, meta, "next", and στάσις, stasis, "placement".

== See also ==
- Abscopal effect
- Brain metastasis
- Brown-Séquard syndrome
- Collective cell migration
- Contact normalization
- Disseminated disease
- Micrometastasis
- Mouse models of breast cancer metastasis
- Positron emission tomography (PET)
- Urogenital pelvic malignancy
