= Extravasation =

Leakage of a fluid out of its container into the surrounding area

Extravasation is the leakage of a fluid out of its contained space into the surrounding area, especially blood or blood cells from vessels. In the case of inflammation, it refers to the movement of white blood cells through the capillary wall, into the surrounding tissues. This is known as leukocyte extravasation, also called diapedesis. In the case of cancer metastasis, it refers to cancer cells exiting the capillaries and entering other tissues, where secondary tumors may form. The term is commonly used in a medical context.

More specifically, extravasation can refer to:

- Extravasation (intravenous)
- Extravasation of infusates
- Extravasation of irrigation fluid
- Extravasation of urine
- Leukocyte extravasation
- Angiopellosis (non-leukocyte cell extravastion)

== Irrigation fluid ==
Extravasation of irrigation fluid is the unintended migration of irrigation fluid (e.g., saline) introduced into a human body. This may occur in several types of endoscopic surgery, such as minimally invasive orthopedic surgery, i.e., arthroscopy, TURP (trans-urethral resection of the prostate), and TCRE (trans-cervical resection of the endometrium).

In arthroscopy, fluid under pressure is used to inflate and distend a joint and make a working surgical space. An arthroscopy is typically performed on shoulder and knee joints; however, hip arthroscopy is becoming more popular. An arthroscopy is done by making surgical portals or puncture wounds into the joint. A surgical instrument called an arthroscope is used to introduce irrigation fluid under pressure to distend the joint. The arthroscope includes a small (typically 4 mm in diameter) optic scope rod to view the joint. Other portals or puncture wounds are made to introduce surgical instruments to perform cutting or repair procedures.

If the joint is surrounded by soft tissue, as in the shoulder and hip, fluid under pressure may leak out of the joint space through the surgical portals and collect in the patient's soft tissue. A typical arthroscopy can result in 1–3 liters of irrigation fluid being absorbed into the patient's interstitial tissue. This buildup of irrigation fluid in the soft tissue may cause edema. This swelling can interfere with the arthroscopic procedure by collapsing the surgical space, or migrating into the patient's neck and causing airway blockage. In hip arthroscopy, a feared complication is abdominal flooding where the irrigation fluid leaks from the hip joint capsule and drains into the abdominal cavity. Risk factors for fluid extravasation include procedure length (>90–120 min), obesity, and age (>45–50) with accompanying lack of muscle tone.

Shoulder arthroscopy is typically limited to about 90–120 minutes before the swelling from fluid extravasation interferes with the procedure, and presents a potential risk to the patient. Typically, fluid extravasation is managed by controlling fluid pressure, or hastening the procedure.

== Infusates ==
Extravasation may also refer to the leakage of infused substances from the vasculature tissue into the subcutaneous tissue. The leakage of high-osmolarity solutions or chemotherapy agents can result in significant tissue destruction and significant complications.

== See also ==
- Arthroscopy
- Intravasation
