= Cell–cell recognition =

Biological ability of cells to distinguish between types of neighboring cells

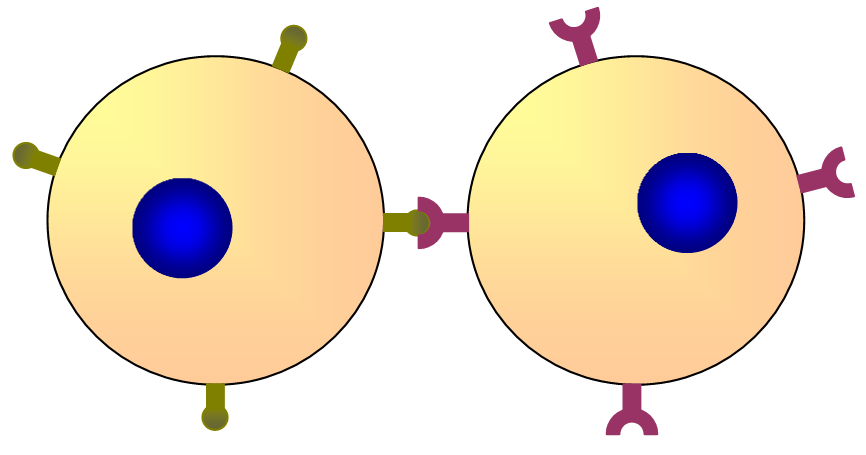
Two cells communicating via their respective surface molecules

In cellular biology, cell–cell recognition is a cell's ability to distinguish one type of neighboring cell from another. This phenomenon occurs when complementary molecules on opposing cell surfaces meet. A receptor on one cell surface binds to its specific ligand on a nearby cell, initiating a cascade of events which regulate cell behaviors ranging from simple adhesion to complex cellular differentiation. Like other cellular functions, cell–cell recognition is impacted by detrimental mutations in the genes and proteins involved and is subject to error. The biological events that unfold due to cell–cell recognition are important for animal development, microbiomes, and human medicine.

== Fundamentals ==
Cell–cell recognition occurs when two molecules restricted to the plasma membranes of different cells bind to each other, triggering a response for communication, cooperation, transport, defense, and/or growth. Rather than induce a distal response, like secreted hormones may do, this type of binding requires the cells with the signalling molecules to be in close proximity with each other. These events can be grouped into two main categories: Intrinsic Recognition and Extrinsic Recognition. Intrinsic Recognition is when cells that are part of the same organism associate. Extrinsic Recognition is when the cell of one organism recognizes a cell from another organism, like when a mammalian cell detects a microorganism in the body. The molecules that complete this binding consist of proteins, carbohydrates, and lipids, resulting in a variety of glycoproteins, lipoproteins, and glycolipoproteins. Studies suggest glycan–glycan interactions, observed to be approximately 200–300 pN, also may play a role in cell–cell recognition. Complex carbohydrates, in particular, have been studied to be extremely integral in cell–cell recognition, especially when it is recognized by complementary carbohydrates. In order to ensure a proper binding site by checking the surrounding areas or securing a bond that was previously made complex carbohydrates and their complementary carbohydrates are able to create flexible interaction systems. These interactions, although observed to be weak, have been studied in a variety of test subjects including, but not limited to, mouse embryonal cells, corneal epithelial cells, and human embryonal carcinoma cells.

== Biological functions for intrinsic recognition ==
=== Growth and development ===
One of the more basic versions of cell–cell recognition for adhesion can be observed in sponges, the most primitive group in the animal kingdom. Sponges develop through the aggregation of individual cells into larger clusters. Through membrane-binding proteins and secreted ions, individual sponge cells are able to coordinate aggregation while preventing fusion between different species or even different individuals. This was discovered when attempts to graft sponge cells from different species or individuals of the same species failed, while attempts using cells from the same individual merged successfully. This is likely due to distinct cadherins, a calcium-binding membrane protein, expressed by different sponge species and individuals. Cadherins are present in more complex organisms as well. In mouse embryos, E-cadherin on cell membranes is responsible for the adhesion of cells needed for embryonic compaction.

=== Cell recognition for injury response ===
When a large multi-cellular organism sustains an injury, cell–cell recognition is often involved in bringing certain types of cells to the site of an injury. A common example of this is selectin-expressing cells in animals. Selectin is a receptor protein found on the membranes of leukocytes, platelet cells, and endothelial cells that binds membrane-bound glycans. In response to an injury, endothelial cells will express selectin, which binds to glycans present on the leukocyte cell surface. Platelet cells, which are involved in tissue repair, use their selectins to associate with leukocytes on the way to the endothelial cells. Leukocytes then use their own selectins to recognize potential pathogens at the site of the injury. In this manner, the appropriate cells are brought to the site of an injury to deal with immediate repair or invading microorganisms.

== Biological functions for extrinsic recognition ==
=== Pathogen recognition in the immune system ===
Cells with immune system recognition abilities include macrophages, dentritic cells, T cells, and B cells. Cell–cell recognition is especially important in the innate immune system, which identifies pathogens very generally. Central to this process is the binding of pattern recognition receptors (PRRs) of phagocytes and pathogen-associated molecular patterns (PAMPs) in pathogenic microorganisms. One type of PRR is a group of integral membrane glycoproteins called toll-like receptors (TLRs), which can recognize certain lipoproteins, peptidoglycan, CpG-rich DNA, and flagellar components in bacterial cells, as well as glycoproteins and phospholipids from protozoan parasites and conidia (fungal spores). The binding of PAMPs to TLR proteins generally results in an internal signaling cascade including a number of phosphorylations, the adding of a phosphate group, and ubiquitinations, the adding of a small protein that marks molecules for degradation, that eventually leads to the transcription of genes related to inflammation. The use of TLRs by cells in the innate immune system has led to an evolutionary battle between pathogenic cells developing different PAMPs that cannot be recognized and immune cells developing new membrane proteins that can recognize them.

=== Bacterial ecology ===
Single-celled organisms can bind to each other through surface receptors for cooperation and competition. This has been widely observed in bacteria. For instance, bacteria can attach to each other through the binding of outer membrane proteins TraA and TraB to facilitate a process called outer membrane exchange (OME) that allows bacterial cells to swap membrane lipids, sugars, and toxins. Cell recognition and OME can only be achieved if TraA and TraB variants from the same recognition group bind. These interactions can generate the physiological diversity required for antibiotic resistance in bacterial populations. The Escherichia coli membrane protein ChiA is involved in the process of contact-dependent inhibition (CDI) in which it binds to receptors on rival E.coli strains and releases a toxin that prevents growth of those strains while the inhibiting cell and members of that strain are protected. The bacterium Proteus mirabilis uses the T6SS protein to initiate swarming and destruction of other bacterial colonies upon recognition, either by release of toxins or by release of signal proteins to other P. mirabilis cells. The binding of bacterial surface receptors for adhesion has also been implicated in the formation of biofilms.

== Recognition of red blood cells ==
=== Blood types ===
Red blood cells contain antigens in their plasma membranes that distinguish them as part of a specific category of blood cell. These antigens can be polysaccharides, glycoproteins, or GPI (a glycolipid) -linked proteins. Antigens range in complexity, from small molecules bound to the extracellular side of the phospholipid bilayer, to large membrane proteins that loop many times between both sides of the membrane. The smaller polysaccharide antigens classify blood cells into types A, B, AB, and O, while the larger protein antigens classify blood cells into types Rh D-positive and Rh D-negative. While the biological role of the correct blood type is unclear and may be vestigial, the consequences of incorrect blood types are known to be severe. The same cells that recognize PAMPs on microbial pathogens may bind to the antigen of a foreign blood cell and recognize it as a pathogen because the antigen is unfamiliar. It is not easy to classify red blood cell recognition as intrinsic or extrinsic, as a foreign cell may be recognized as part of the organism if it has the right antigens.

== Detrimental mutations ==
=== TLR mutations ===
Mutations in mammalian receptor proteins can cause disorders in cell–cell recognition, increasing individual susceptibility to certain pathogens and chronic conditions. When mutations occurs in genes that code for TLRs, the proteins can lose the ability to bind with polysaccharides, lipids, or proteins on the cell wall or membrane of single-celled pathogens, resulting in a failure of the innate immune system to respond to infection that allows disease to develop rapidly. In particular, mutations in the genes for TLR2 and TLR4 have been frequently implicated in increased susceptibility to pathogens. A threonine to cysteine mutation in the TRL2 gene has been connected to failure to recognize the Mycobacterium tuberculosis the causative agent of Tuberculosis meningitis. The same mutation, T597C, was later observed consistently with the failure to recognize Mycobacterium leprae, the causative agent of Leprosy. An Arginine to Glutamine mutation in TRL2, Arg753Gln, was connected to increased pediatric Urinary Tract Infections caused by gram-positive bacteria. Multiple mutations in TLR4, Asp299Gly and Thr399Ile, were implicated in susceptibility to the bacterial pathogens that cause Periodontitis. The connection of TLR mutations to Chron's Disease has also been investigated, but has not yielded conclusive evidence. The common characteristic between these missense mutations is that the amino acid residues that are substituted have notably different side chain properties, which likely contributes to the defective TLR protein function.
