= Invasion (cancer) =

Direct extension and penetration by cancer cells into neighboring tissues

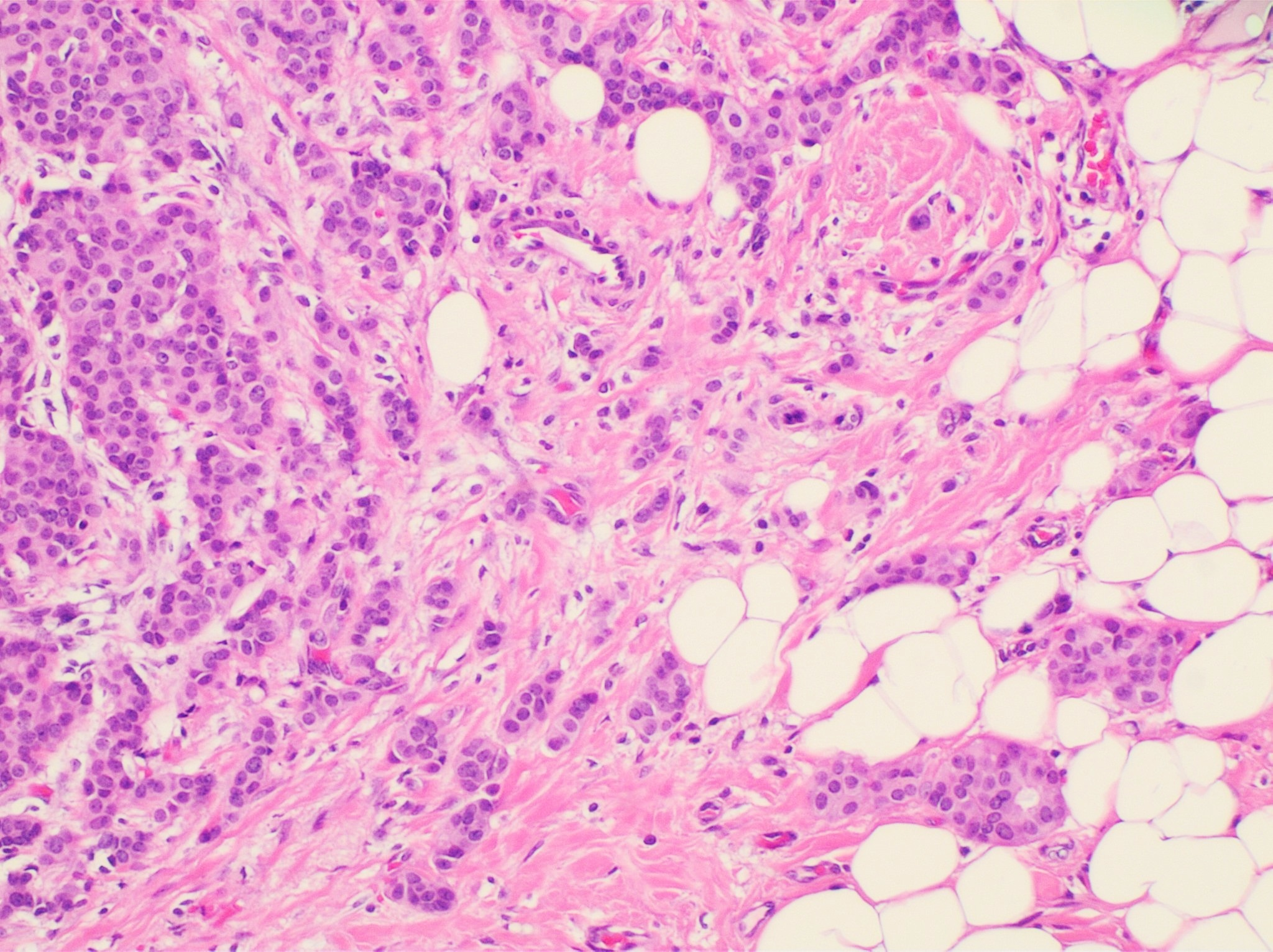
Histopathology of an invasive carcinoma of no special type of the breast. The presence of irregular tumor nests in fatty tissue at right in image confirms the invasive nature.

Invasion is the process by which cancer cells directly extend and penetrate into neighboring tissues in cancer. It is generally distinguished from metastasis, which is the spread of cancer cells through the circulatory system or the lymphatic system to more distant locations. The two are nonetheless closely related, and lymphovascular invasion is generally the first step of metastasis.

The two main patterns of cancer cell invasion by cell migration are collective cell migration and individual cell migration, by which tumor cells overcome barriers of the extracellular matrix and spread into surrounding tissues. Either pattern of cell migration exhibits distinct morphological features and is governed by specific biochemical and molecular genetic mechanisms.

Two types of migrating tumor cells, mesenchymal (fibroblast-like) and amoeboid, can be observed in various patterns of cancer cell invasion. This article describes the key differences between the variants of cancer cell migration, the role of epithelial-mesenchymal and related transitions, as well as the significance of different tumor factors and stromal molecules in tumor invasion. Morphological manifestations of the invasion patterns are characterized by a variety of tissue (tumor) structures.

== Invasive growth and metastasis ==
The results of numerous experimental and clinical studies of malignant neoplasms have indicated that invasive growth and metastasis are the main manifestations of tumor progression, which constitute two closely related processes.

A malignant tumor is defined by its capacity to initiate a biological phenomenon known as the metastatic cascade, a complex multi-stage process in which cell invasion precedes further cancer progression and the formation of metastases in distant organs and tissues. Massive metastatic lesions lead to the development of organ failure. The range between the "end" points of a complex invasive metastatic process–an invasion of the primary tumor into surrounding tissues and the formation of metastatic foci–comprises several stages, the passage of which is strictly necessary for the successful development and subsequent progression of tumor growth: intravasation, survival and presence in the systemic circulation, extravasation with subsequent colonization of organs by tumor cells, and the formation of clinically detectable metastases. Tumor growth is accompanied by increasing pressure on surrounding extracellular matrix structures, whereas the tissue microenvironment works to retain its functional-anatomic integrity by increasing pressure on the tumor cells. The factors limiting the growth of malignant neoplasms include the basement membrane and various components of the surrounding stroma, increased interstitial pressure, limited oxygen supply to tumor cells and the production of reactive oxygen species, and persistent contact with immune system cells. Due to intratumoral heterogeneity, some tumor cells may undergo regression and death, while others, resilient against opposing microenvironmental factors, acquire an aggressive phenotype and the capacity to metastasize.

Invasive tumor growth is enabled by the detachment of malignant cells from the tumor mass due to a reduction in or complete loss of intercellular adhesion molecules. This allows the cells to gain anomalously high motility enabling penetration through the stiff structural elements of the surrounding stroma.

The process by which epithelial cells lose their cell polarity and cell–cell adhesion, and gain migratory and invasive properties to become mesenchymal stem cells, is referred to as an epithelial-mesenchymal transition (EMT). EMTs are a normal feature of diverse biological processes such as embryogenesis and wound healing. However, in the context of metastasis, they facilitate the invasion of tumor cells into other areas of the body.

== Physiological prototypes of invasive growth ==
Tumor cells have the ability to replicate the mechanisms and migration patterns typically seen in normal, non-tumor cells during various physiological processes. Like normal cells, tumor cells can activate these mechanisms to alter their shape, create favorable conditions for movement, and reshape nearby tissues to form pathways for migration. However, tumor cells, in contrast to normal cells, do not have physiological "stop signals" to terminate these processes. This leads to the establishment of the migration mechanisms and promotes the progression and spread of the tumor.

Malignant cells were found to use built-in genetic programs to implement the processes that determine invasive growth and metastasis. For example, the movement of individual cells observed during embryonic development and inflammation (e.g., leukocyte migration) is similar to the dissemination of cancer cells during tumor progression and metastasis.

Along with single cell migration, collective cell migration can occur when groups of firmly interconnected tumor cells migrate together. This type of migration indicates tissue rearrangement, underlies the processes of embryonic morphogenesis, and is also an essential component of the healing of wound surfaces.

In this way malignant tumor cells use the mechanisms of both collective and single cell migration as physiological prototypes in the process of invasive growth and metastasis.

== Patterns of invasive growth ==
Two distinct patterns of invasive growth are distinguished based on specific morphological and molecular genetic parameters: single-cell migration and collective cell migration. The migration type is predominantly influenced by characteristics of the tissue microenvironment, and is dependent on molecular changes within the tumor cells.

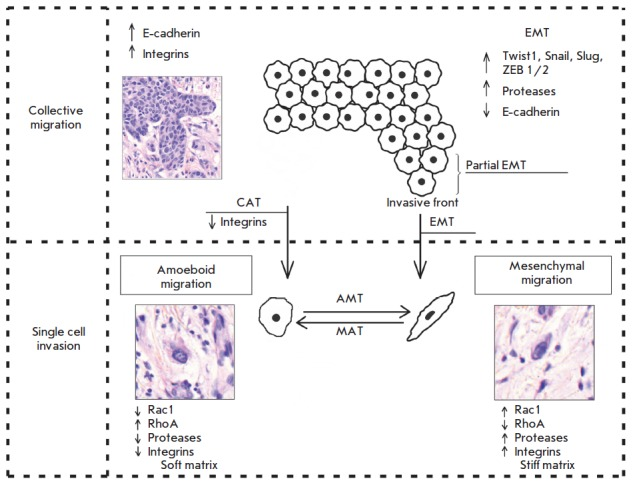
Patterns of cancer cell invasion: collective cell and individual cell migration. In collective cell migration, tumor cells exhibit high expression of E-cadherin and integrins. Epithelial-mesenchymal (EMT) and collective-amoeboid (CAT) transitions are a trigger between collective cell invasion and individual cell migration. EMT involves activation of transcription factors, such as TWIST1, Snail, Slug, ZEB1/2, a decrease in E-cadherin expression, and an increase in protease activity. During EMT, tumor cells acquire the mesenchymal phenotype, detach from the tumor mass, and migrate by the mesenchymal mechanism. In contrast, the partial EMT that is specific to the tumor invasive front means that tumor cells retain cell-cell adhesion but already possess migratory ability. This tumor cell phenotype was named the "epithelial-mesenchymal" phenotype. In CAT, which takes place when β1 integrins are down-regulated, tumor cells detach from the tumor mass and move by the amoeboid mechanism. Amoeboid migration involves a decrease in protease and integrin expression and changes in the activity of GTPases – inhibition of Rac1 and activation of RhoA. This movement type occurs in the loose/soft extracellular matrix. In contrast, mesenchymal migration is associated with the opposite phenotype and predominates in the dense/stiff matrix. These two movement types are highly plastic and can convert to each other, depending on the extracellular matrix type and intracellular regulation.

Determination of the invasion mechanism used by single migrating cells during migration is a complex task. Before 2015, studies examining this at the molecular and morphological levels were few in numbers and mostly were carried out in vitro using specific cell lines.

However, there has been a subsequent increase in the number of studies that demonstrate interest in the molecular genetic features of tumor cells that determine the main differences between the mesenchymal and amoeboid types of cell movement during individual migration, as well as collective migration.

=== Collective migration ===
Collective migration is characterized by the migration of whole groups of cells interconnected by adhesion molecules and other communication junctions. This is the main feature of this type of invasion, since the underlying cellular mechanisms are the same processes that largely determine single cell migration.

Collective cell migration has been observed in the development and progression of breast and endometrial cancer, prostate cancer, colorectal cancer, large-cell lung carcinoma, rhabdomyosarcoma, melanoma, as well as most squamous cell carcinomas.

In the case of collective migration, cancer cells, being a part of the tumor mass or detaching from it in the form of multicellular groups, penetrate into the surrounding tissues and form thin, short chords, clusters, stripes and wide fields, as well as structures with lumen, that indicate a wide variety of structural elements involved in tumor invasion.

Collective migration is characterized by the migration of whole cell groups interconnected by cadherins and intercellular gap junctions. A moving cell group has a "leading edge" or "leading front" that uses integrins and proteases. Observable differences exist in the expression of the genes and morphology between the "leader" cells forming the leading edge and the "follower" cells that are located behind them, at the "trailing edge". The cell shape of the "leaders" often resembles mesenchymal cells and is characterized by a less pronounced ordering and structural organization, while the "followers" tend to form more tightly packed, rosette-like tubular structures with tight intercellular contacts.

In the case of collective migration, tumor cells form protrusions (pseudopodia) at the leading edge, use integrins to form focal contacts with the actin cytoskeleton, and perform proteolytic degradation of the extracellular matrix, creating a space for invasion of the tumor tissue and extensively involving the actin-myosin contractile apparatus in the process to ensure successful migration.

The differences in the polarity of collectively migrating cell groups are due to the expression of surface receptors, such as CXCR4 and CXCR7 chemokine receptors, in the "leader" cells. The growth factors and chemokines produced by stromal cells form a diffusion gradient and induce cell polarization. Involvement of chemokines, such as SDF1 (CXCL12), the fibroblast growth factor (FGF), and the transforming growth factor β (TGF-β), in these processes has been discussed in the literature.

The involvement of TGF-β in carcinogenesis is twofold. TGF-β, which acts in the epithelial cells of the mammary gland as a potent tumor suppressor at the early stages of cancer, can affect tumor development via interaction with oncogenic cytokines. Increased expression of TGF-β has been associated with the progression of tumors, which has often been observed, e.g., at the later stages of breast cancer. TGF-β is a regulator of the interactions between the tumor and stroma, which promotes collective cell migration in breast cancer.

It has been established that leader cells express podoplanin, a transmembrane glycoprotein that is expressed under normal conditions in kidney podocytes, type 1 alveolar cells, skeletal muscle cells, placenta, etc. Podoplanin expression in breast cancer cells induces cell migration and invasion with the formation of filopodia and simultaneous retention of E-cadherin expression.

Collectively migrating cancer cells can potentially use the ability of adjacent mesenchymal cells to modify the structure of the matrix and rebuild it, and then follow in their "footsteps". In in vitro experiments, the introduction of fibroblasts in the culture induces collective tumor cell migration to the underlying matrix in the form of chains. In this way, fibroblasts guide invading tumor cells, remodeling the surrounding extracellular matrix into pathways with thick collagen bundles on the sides and a lack of a matrix in the center.

LIM-kinase, an enzyme whose substrate stabilizes actin, plays a role in the collective migration of tumor cells. This protein is known to be involved in the regulation of developing invadopodias, which are structures typical of malignant tumor cells and responsible for the destruction of the surrounding extracellular matrix. Excessive activation of LIM-kinase is displayed in breast cancer. Breast tumor cells with suppressed expression of the LIM-kinase gene lose their ability to invade due to the loss of their ability to disrupt the extracellular matrix.

=== Single cell invasion ===
Single cell invasion is distinguished by individual tumor cells invading the surrounding tissues independently of each other. In this type of tumor invasion, single cell migration can occur via two different movement types: mesenchymal and amoeboid. These movement types are highly plastic and can shift from one type of migration to the other (from mesenchymal to amoeboid and vice versa). These transitions usually occur upon changes in the activity of certain cell molecules when tumor cells have to adapt to the peculiarities of the microenvironment.

==== Mesenchymal (fibroblast-like) cell migration ====
The mesenchymal mechanisms of invasive cell growth, in contrast to the amoeboid type of migration, are characterized by the occurrence of more complex processes and the involvement of a larger number of cellular molecules.

This type of migration is typical of keratinocytes during reparative regeneration, endotheliocytes, smooth muscle cells, and fibroblasts. Since malignant cells that use mesenchymal-type movement lose their epithelial polarity and adopt an elongated spindle shape resembling that of fibroblasts, this type of invasion is also referred to as 'fibroblast-like' migration. Mesenchymal invasion has been detected during the development of melanoma, fibrosarcoma, glioblastoma, and other malignancies.

Most of the cancer cells that detach from the tumor mass and invade the surrounding tissues are known to undergo certain changes, acquiring the morphological properties and a phenotype typical of mesenchymal cells. This transformation of a malignant epithelial cell, which is related to the emergence of new molecular and morphological features in the cell, is called the epithelial-mesenchymal transition (EMT). The mesenchymal mechanism of invasion is believed to be the consequence of EMT, when active dedifferentiation of a malignant epithelial tumor occurs, and multicellular groups start to divide into single tumor cells, gaining a mesenchymal phenotype.

Tumor cells during the mesenchymal type of migration go through a number of specific sequential steps that constitute a five-stage model of migration. This cycle includes the following changes: 1) formation of a protrusion on one of the cell poles – a lamellipodia or a filopodia produced by contractions of the actin cytoskeleton under the control of small GTPases Rac1 and Cdc42 with rapid involvement of integrins of the β1 family; 2) occurrence of focal adhesion with the involvement of integrins β1 and β3 at the contact site between the extracellular matrix and the cell; 3) assembly of focal contacts, which is based on integrin-mediated interactions, and activation of proteolytic enzymes (matrix metalloproteinases, serine and threonine proteases, cathepsins) at the "cell-matrix" interface that leads to the destruction and remodeling of the surrounding extracellular matrix; 4) a change in the actin cytoskeleton polarization under myosin II-mediated control, the occurrence of cell body contractions; and 5) "pulling" the trailing edge toward movement through the newly formed defects in the matrix structure. Since the cells which use the fibroblast-like mechanism of invasion follow the described migration steps, their speed of movement is low: about 0.1– μm/min.

The possibility of proteolysis and remodeling of tissue structures explains the fact that mesenchymal movement of a tumor cell undergoes more minor changes, compared to amoeboid migration, in the cell's shape and by minimal deformation of the nucleus.

In mesenchymal migration, tumor cells exhibit more minor changes to their shape and deformation of their nucleus compared to in amoeboid migration. This is because mesenchymal migration often involves proteolysis and remodeling of the extracellular matrix, allowing cells to move through tissues more efficiently while preserving their overall integrity. Amoeboid migration, on the other hand, is characterized by a more rounded and flexible cell shape, with a higher degree of deformation of both the cell and the nucleus. It often occurs when cells need to squeeze through tight spaces in tissues.

The behavior of tumor cells during individual migration depends on the surrounding matrix's stiffness. For example, the mesenchymal or proteolytic model of migration dominates under conditions of a "stiff" ("dense") surrounding matrix. The high migration efficiency of a single cell using the mesenchymal mechanism in dense tissues is explained by proteolysis due to the secretion of various proteases and by the ability to form focal contacts with stromal elements.

The key points of the fibroblast-like mechanism of invasive growth are strong adhesion forces on both poles of the cell as well as between cells and extracellular matrix components, pronounced expression of integrins (β1 and β3 families), proteolysis with destruction and subsequent remodeling of tissues with the formation of defects in the matrix structure, and movement of a single cell or cell chains through the defects. The nucleus deformation is minimal, and a slow rate of cell migration is observed.

Based on the suppression of the expression of the relevant genes using small interfering RNAs, the specific activity of GTPases Rac1 and Cdc42 was demonstrated to be the characteristic feature of the mesenchymal type of invasion. Suppression of GTPase Rac1 through signaling activation of GTPase RhoA and its effector, ROCK kinase, leads to blockage of the mesenchymal migration of tumor cells.

==== Amoeboid cell migration ====
The amoeboid mechanism of invasive growth is the most primitive and, at the same time, the most efficient mode of migration of single tumor cells. In all of its features, it is similar to the behavior and movement of a single-celled organism, such as the amoeba Dictyostelium discoideum.

The use of antibodies that block integrins or protease inhibitors in clinical trials leads to the emergence of tumor cells with the amoeboid type of migration. Similar results were obtained in studies of malignant tumors in vivo. A relationship between the application of drugs on the basis of matrix metalloproteinase inhibitors in cancer therapy and progression of the tumor process was established. The explanation of this relationship became possible only after the identification of tumor cells capable of amoeboid migration. These data most likely indicate that, under conditions of a reduction in or complete loss of their ability to spread to the surrounding tissues using the main molecules that perform adhesion and destruction of the extracellular matrix, tumor cells turn to the amoeboid mechanism of invasion, which becomes the only and most effective mode of migration.

This type of migration has been described in circulating stem cells, leukocytes, and certain types of tumor cells. According to Zijl et al., the amoeboid type of invasive growth has been observed in breast cancer, lymphoma, small cell lung cancer, prostate cancer, and melanoma.

In the case of amoeboid migration, malignant tumor cells have been demonstrated to have a round or elliptical shape. Amoeboid cells are characterized by fast deformability, adaption of their shapes to existing structures of the surrounding extracellular matrix, and penetration through them via narrow spaces in a compressed form. Movement and relocation are carried out through successive high-speed cycles of expansion and contraction of the cell's body with the development of "bleb-like" protrusions of the cell membrane. These blebs allow the cell to investigate the microenvironment to find the most suitable route of movement to bypass various obstacles, whereby tumor cells are capable of moving through narrow gaps in the extracellular matrix. Developing changes in the cell shape are generated by the cortical actin cytoskeleton that is, in turn, controlled by small GTPase RhoA and its effector, ROCK kinase. This GTPase belongs to the superfamily of small GTP hydrolases, whose members play key roles in the amoeboid type of invasion, since they are involved in signal transduction and, thereby, in the regulation of a wide variety of processes occurring in the cell, including reorganization of the actin cytoskeleton during migration.

Migration through the amoeboid mechanism of invasion is accompanied by changes not only in the cell shape, but also in the shape of the nucleus and its orientation and position relative to other internal organelles. The nucleus, being the largest organelle and stiffer than the surrounding cytoskeleton, is mechanically firmly stabilized by an extensive network of structural proteins. For this reason, its shape generally does not undergo significant changes. However, the amoeboid type of migration is characterized by a pronounced deformation of the nucleus in order to overcome the lack of proteolytic degradation of the surrounding matrix. Since tumor cells have to move through narrow spaces and pores, the nucleus in this case also occurs in a maximum compressed state. Like the amoeboid movement of leukocytes, nuclei inside single migrating tumor cells move forward toward the leading edge.

In contrast to the mesenchymal movement, amoeboid or a non-proteolytic model of migration prevails when the surrounding matrix is characterized by relatively low stiffness ("soft" matrix). For example, amoeboid migration of tumor cells in the lymphatic and circulatory systems is considered as migration in a soft matrix.

Condeelis and Segall elucidated some features of cell migration on the example of two different tumor lines, MTC and MTLn3, under in vitro and in vivo conditions. MTLn3 cells that have a high metastatic potential and migrate probably by the amoeboid mechanism of invasive growth are characterized by a higher level of expression of epidermal growth factor receptors (EGFRs) than MTC cells with a low metastatic potential. Their migration is associated with the presence of blood vessels and collagen-containing fibers in the surrounding matrix. Tumor cell chemotaxis towards blood vessels is believed to be mediated by the signaling pathways of EGFR.

The amoeboid mechanism of invasion has a number of distinctive features. It is characterized by a weak interaction between cells and the surrounding matrix, as well as a lack of or weak focal contacts. The possibility to retain the rapid and non-focal assembly of receptors at the sites of cell contacts with the extracellular substrate exists. Integrins are not important in this type of invasive growth. Important aspects are the absence of proteolysis at the sites of cell-matrix interactions and the lack of expression of proteolytic enzymes that destroy the extracellular matrix. In vitro studies have demonstrated that, in the case of an amoeboid type of invasive growth, it is likely due to these properties that tumor cells are capable of moving at the highest speed in cultures (20 μm/min).

==== Amoeboid-mesenchymal and mesenchymal-amoeboid transitions ====
There exists a degree of plasticity and the possibility of a "shift" from one migration type to the other (from the mesenchymal type to the amoeboid one and vice versa) upon individual cell invasion. These events are due to the appearance of changes in the activity of certain cell molecules and the need to adapt to tissue microenvironment conditions.

These changes are described as amoeboid-mesenchymal and mesenchymal-amoeboid transitions. Tumor cells using the mesenchymal type of migration can be changed in a certain way and shift to the amoeboid type of movement under conditions of a weakened signal and mechanical pathways that are directly involved in the stabilization of the interactions between extracellular matrix structures and malignant cells. The following mechanisms leading to the transition of cells from the mesenchymal to the amoeboid type of invasive growth (mesenchymal-amoeboid transition) have been described: 1) reduction in or complete abolition of pericellular proteolysis due to application of protease inhibitors; 2) reduction in the activity of integrin receptors and their interactions with surrounding stromal elements by their antagonists; 3) increase in and stabilization of the activity of small GTPase RhoA and its ROCK effector. A study by S. Berton's group indicated that the p27 protein plays an important role in the control of cell motility. In particular, a lack of this protein under in vitro conditions induces the mesenchymal-amoeboid transition in cells in a 3D matrix.

There exists the possibility of an amoeboid-mesenchymal transition that is the reverse process to the mesenchymal-amoeboid transition. There is a hypothesis according to which the mechanism of amoeboid-mesenchymal transition most likely relies on the same molecular basis, and that the only reliable process that determines the possibility of the described transformation is an imbalance in the activity of members of the small GTPase family and predominance of the Rac activity over the RhoA activity.

== Collective-individual transitions ==
Tumor cells within a single tumor can simultaneously move both collectively and individually. In this case, the transition from individual to collective migration is an important step towards increasing the invasive and metastatic potential of malignant neoplasms. For example, breast tumor cells detached from the solid mass gain the ability to invade lymphatic vessels. Currently, two mechanisms are distinguished: epithelial-mesenchymal and collective-amoeboid transitions by which individually migrating tumor cells are produced. In turn, the latter, in particular cells that have undergone EMT, are capable under certain conditions of gaining an epithelial phenotype and forming tumor multicellular complexes. This phenotype inversion is called the "mesenchymal-epithelial transition".

=== Epithelial-mesenchymal transition ===
The epithelial-mesenchymal transition is a mechanism during which the tumor cell detaches from the epithelial layer and gains motility, the "locomotor phenotype," which promotes invasive growth and metastasis. The development of this process as a key factor of cancer progression was shown in vitro using specific tumor lines as well as experimental models; however, establishment of the EMT development and identification of tumor cells and their main characteristics under in vivo conditions is a complex task.

EMTs are the basis of many processes of morphogenesis. It is believed that under normal conditions (during embryogenesis) EMTs can be induced by the hepatocyte growth factor (HGF) secreted by fibroblasts. HGF binds to specific c-Met receptors located on the membrane of epithelial cells. The binding to receptors activates a signaling pathway involving some proteins of the small GTPase system (Cdc42, Rac, RhoA, RhoC) that regulates the intensity of actin microfilament polymerization and the contractility of actin-myosin filaments, which determines the intensity of lamellipodia formation and tension of the matrix-attached cell. In this case, there is significant rearrangement of the whole actin-myosin cytoskeleton and loss of E-cadherin intercellular contacts. During carcinogenesis, epithelial cells are subjected to a morphological transformation that is phenotypically similar to EMT but develops in the absence of the relevant HGF ligand. This transformation in malignant tumors can be induced by transfection of various oncogenes. During transformation, tumor cells can leave the epithelial layer and move like fibroblasts, thereby gaining the ability to invade and metastasize.

During EMT, the following events occur: malignant epithelial cells lose their apical-basal polarity due to disruption in tight intercellular junctions and loss of cellular adhesion molecules (such as E-cadherin and integrins); the cellular actin cytoskeleton is changed and subjected to remodeling with the formation of stress fibers that are collected in certain cell parts near the cell membrane, where specific cellular protrusions begin subsequently to form; degradation of the underlying basal membrane of the epithelium occurs, which results in tumor cells lacking intercellular contacts becoming capable of invasive growth and penetration into the surrounding stromal matrix and beginning active migration.

EMT was found to be rarely equally pronounced throughout the entire tumor tissue. More likely, this process is characterized by a varying intensity of the transition of cells from the epithelial to the mesenchymal phenotype. In this regard, the "partial EMT" can be described, in which most cells in the invasive front are involved. Partial EMT is a state in which cells have already gained the properties necessary for successful migration, but continue to retain cell-cell contacts. This phenotype was called the hybrid "epithelial-mesenchymal" phenotype and was linked to the features characteristic of collectively migrating tumor cells.

Taddei et al. have indicated that EMT develops due to the induction of programs associated with the activation of key transcription factors, such as TWIST1, Snail, Slug, and ZEB1/2. This results in the disruption of strong cadherin junctions and activation of polar cell migration and proteolysis of extracellular matrix components by various secreted proteases, with the functions of integrin receptors being retained. The role of the transcription factor Prrx1, which determines the potential of breast cancer cells for invasive growth, was experimentally established.

It was shown that ZEB1 and ZEB2 proteins with a zinc finger domain are able to directly bind to promoters, thereby inducing the expression of mesenchymal marker genes and suppressing the expression of E-cadherin and other epithelial markers.

Similarly, Snail and Slug are able to suppress the expression of the E-cadherin gene via direct binding to its promoter, as well as production of epithelial proteins such as desmoplakin and claudin, and activate the expression of vimentin and matrix metalloproteinases, thereby increasing cell migration. A team of researchers led by Sanchez-Tillo found that the transcription factor Snail does not occur in normal epithelial cells and that its detection in cells of the tumor invasive front can be considered as a predictor of poor survival of cancer patients. It is believed that ZEB1/2, Snail, and Slug are induced by TGF-β, inflammatory cytokines, and hypoxia.

=== Collective-amoeboid transition ===
Experimental data indicates the potential existence of a collective-amoeboid transition, when tumor masses invading surrounding tissues in the form of collective multicellular groups dissociate into single migrating cells that use the amoeboid movement. This event has been shown to become possible with the application of inhibitors of integrin receptors of the β1 family, since these molecules play a key role both in the formation of cell-cell contacts and in the interactions between tumor cells and surrounding tissue components.

=== Mesenchymal-epithelial transition ===
As of 2015 there were no studies devoted to the investigation of the mechanisms underlying the mesenchymal-epithelial transition (MET). However, the possibility of such a phenomenon is recognized. In this case, it is said that often, e.g. in breast and prostate cancer, the tissue structure in distant metastatic foci is similar to the primary tumor structure. According to Friedl and Gilmour, several assumptions can be made based on these data. First, invasion and metastasis can occur without EMT. Second, detection of single disseminated cells during a routine pathologic examination of tumor tissue samples seems to be a rather complex task, and identification of these cells during EMT is not possible. And, third, tumor cells temporarily use the EMT mechanisms for intravasation and spread to distant organs and tissues, where they return to the epithelial phenotype. This transformation is described as the mesenchymal-epithelial transition. MET has been induced experimentally, and individually moving cells formed multicellular complexes, but the molecular mechanisms of MET under physiological conditions remain unknown. Nguyen et al. demonstrated that the selective inhibitor PD173074 of the fibroblast growth factor receptor 1 (FGFR1) inhibits the MAPK signaling pathway regulating the activity of the AP-1 protein, which, in turn, induces the development of MET. Investigation of the possibility of using the PD173074 inhibitor as a drug, which was conducted on specific tumor cell lines, revealed a distinct suppression of tumor growth, migration ability, and invasion. In this case, a decrease in the expression of Snail and the matrix metalloproteinase 3, 10, 12 and 13 genes and an increase in the expression of the E-cadherin gene were observed.

== Classification of invasive growth types on the example of breast cancer ==
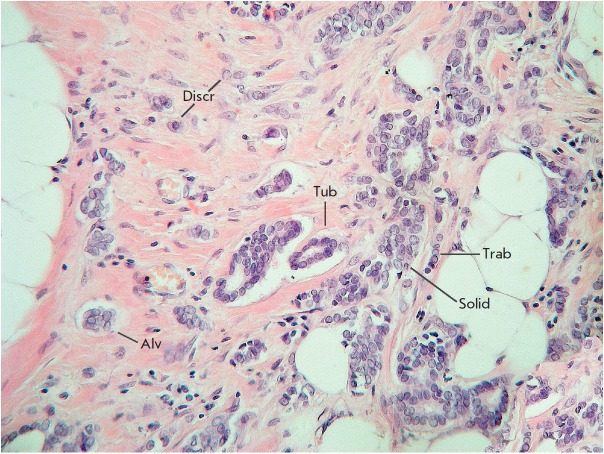
Intratumoral morphological heterogeneity in invasive breast carcinoma. Diversity of invasive growth of breast cancer is shown, which can be classified into five main morphological structures: alveolar, trabecular, tubular, solid structures, and discrete groups of tumor cells. Hematoxylin and eosin staining. Magnification of 200x.

Krakhmal et al. have studied the features of breast cancer progression depending on intratumoral heterogeneity. Attention has been paid to the phenotypic diversity of the primary tumor in invasive carcinoma of no special type, which accounts for the bulk (80%) of all histological types of breast cancer.

Despite the structural diversity of the primary breast tumor, five main types of morphological structures can be distinguished: alveolar, trabecular, tubular and solid structures, and discrete groups of tumor cells. The alveolar structures are tumor cell clusters of round or slightly irregular shape. The morphology of the cells that form this type of structures varies from small cells with moderate cytoplasm and round nuclei to large cells with hyperchromatic nuclei of irregular shape and moderate cytoplasm. The trabecular structures are either short, linear associations formed by a single row of small, rather monomorphic cells or wide cell clusters consisting of two rows of medium-sized cells with moderate cytoplasm and round normochromic or hyperchromatic nuclei. The tubular structures are formed by a single or two rows of rather monomorphic cells with round normochromic nuclei. The solid structures are fields of various sizes and shapes, consisting of either small cells with moderate cytoplasm and monomorphic nuclei or large cells with abundant cytoplasm and polymorphic nuclei. Discrete groups of cells occur in the form of clusters of one to four cells with variable morphologies.

The different morphological structures of breast tumors correspond to certain types of invasion. Therefore, alveolar, trabecular, and solid structures that are characterized by the presence of cell-cell contacts may be referred to morphological manifestations of collective migration, while discrete groups of tumor cells may be referred to manifestations of individual migration. The first batch of data obtained in a study of the expression of cell adhesion genes confirms this hypothesis. For example, there was a decrease in the activity of the genes of cadherins, which are responsible for cell-cell contacts, in the order: solid – alveolar and trabecular structures – discrete groups of tumor cells. In this case, the number of expressed genes of integrins involved in the adhesion of tumor cells to the extracellular matrix was reduced in the order: solid and alveolar – trabecular structures – discrete groups of tumor cells.

== Types of invasive growth in tumor progression and therapy efficacy ==
Invasive growth and the development of drug resistance are related processes that play an important role in tumor progression: in particular in metastasis. It is likely that the same signaling pathways are involved in cell migration and the development of tumor resistance to therapy.

Migrating tumor cells (regardless of the movement's type) are more resistant to chemotherapy and radiotherapy than non-moving cells. This is largely due to the fact that migrating cells temporarily lose their ability to divide. It is also due to the fact that moving tumor cells display increased activity of anti-apoptotic genes, which causes resistance to chemotherapeutic drugs aimed at induction of programmed cell death. In addition, cells in the EMT state are known to also exhibit chemoresistance. This drug resistance is due to induction, during EMT, of the synthesis of the ABC family proteins responsible for the efflux of chemotherapeutic drugs out of the cell. The main transcription factors that trigger EMT and, at the same time, positively regulate the activity of ABC transporters include TWIST1, Snail, etc.

There potentially exists a strong association between collective migration and resistance to radiotherapy and chemotherapy. According to research by Krakhmal et al., breast tumors containing both alveolar and trabecular structures, as well as demonstrating significant morphological diversity, are characterized by increased drug resistance. The contribution of the trabecular structures to chemoresistance is probably explained by the high activity of ABC transporters in tumor cells of a given morphological variant. In contrast, resistance of breast tumors containing the alveolar structure is explained by other, yet unidentified, causes.

Invasive growth and its phenotypic diversity are associated, both directly and through the development of drug resistance, with metastasis. Circulating tumor cells, which are responsible for the development of future metastases, are a result of the invasion and subsequent penetration of tumor cells into lymphatic or blood vessels. Not only single migrating tumor cells, but also cell groups can have the intravasation ability. There is an assumption that collective migration much more often leads to metastasis compared to individual migration. Studies in animal models have demonstrated that metastases more often form after intravenous injection of tumor clusters rather than single tumor cells. Furthermore, circulating tumor cell clusters have been found in the blood of patients with various cancers. It was assumed that collective intravasation is related to the VEGF-dependent formation of dilated vasculature and the accumulation of intravasated tumor clusters. Furthermore, groups of tumor cells can enter circulation through damaged vessels or by cooperation with cells in the EMT state and cancer-associated fibroblasts that disrupt the extracellular matrix by releasing proteases. Metastasis is dependent on collective migration. For example, the presence of alveolar structures in tumors in postmenopausal breast cancer patients is associated with a high rate of lymphogenous metastasis, whereas the risk of this type of progression in premenopause females increases with an increase in the number of different types of morphological structures. The latter dependence is also quantitative: lymphogenous metastases were detected more frequently in the case of a larger number of alveolar structures in breast tumors. Furthermore, patients with alveolar structures in tumors had a low metastasis-free survival rate (our own unpublished data).

The relationship between the alveolar structures, as one of the manifestations of collective migration, and the rate of lymphogenous and hematogenous metastasis supports the following assumptions. The cellular elements of the alveolar structures differ from tumor cells of other structures by a set of biological properties determining the metastatic phenotype. The relationship between alveolar structures and lymphogenous metastasis in the menopausal period suggests a certain role of estrogens, including also their production in situ, in that tumor cells of the alveolar structures gain the metastatic phenotype through the lymphogenous pathway.

== In situ versus invasive ==
By the degree of invasion, a cancer can be classified as in situ when malignant cells are present as a tumor but have not metastasized, or invaded beyond the layer or tissue type where it arose. For example, a cancer of epithelial origin with such features is called carcinoma in situ, and is defined as not having invaded beyond the basement membrane. In contrast, an invasive carcinoma has invaded beyond the basement membrane. Once this occurs, the invasive front of cancer shows several molecular changes, indicative of an increased propensity to further invade and metastasize.

== Conclusion ==
Migration of tumor cells during invasive growth can occur both via single cells and via groups of cells. This diversity of cell migration types probably leads to the development of intratumoral heterogeneity that is represented, e.g. in breast cancer, by different morphological structures: alveolar, trabecular, and solid structures and discrete groups of tumor cells. A number of biochemical and molecular genetic mechanisms are known that enable malignant cells to invade surrounding tissues and gain the ability to spread beyond the primary tumor site, giving rise to the development of secondary metastatic foci in distant organs and tissues. However, there remain unexplored questions concerning a possible relationship between different types of invasive cell growth and the parameters of lymphogenous and hematogenous metastasis, the features of disease progression, as well as the efficacy of the chosen therapy. Solutions to these problems could help in determining the disease prognosis and, possibly, developing new approaches to the management of cancer patients.

== See also ==
- Perineural invasion
- Metastasis
