= Collective–amoeboid transition =

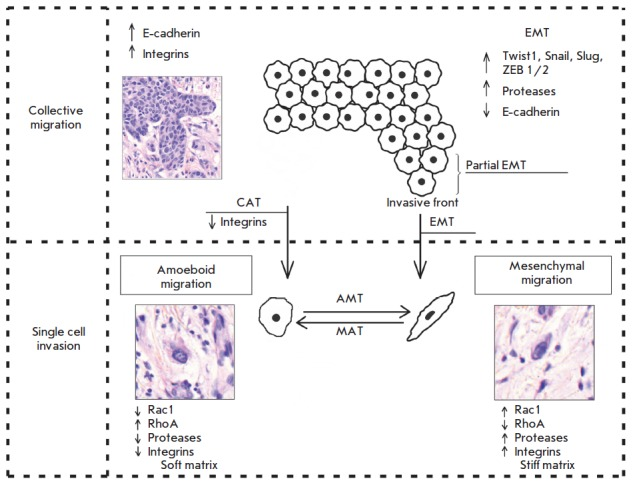
Patterns of cancer cell invasion: collective cell and individual cell migration. In collective cell migration, tumor cells exhibit high expression of E-cadherin and integrins. Epithelial-mesenchymal (EMT) and collective-amoeboid (CAT) transitions are a trigger between collective cell invasion and individual cell migration. EMT involves activation of transcription factors, such as TWIST1, Snail, Slug, ZEB1/2, a decrease in E-cadherin expression, and an increase in protease activity. During EMT, tumor cells acquire the mesenchymal phenotype, detach from the tumor mass, and migrate by the mesenchymal mechanism. In contrast, the partial EMT that is specific to the tumor invasive front means that tumor cells retain cell-cell adhesion but already possess migratory ability. This tumor cell phenotype was named the “epithelial-mesenchymal” phenotype. In CAT, which takes place when β1 integrins are down-regulated, tumor cells detach from the tumor mass and move by the amoeboid mechanism. Amoeboid migration involves a decrease in protease and integrin expression and changes in the activity of GTPases – inhibition of Rac1 and activation of RhoA. This movement type occurs in the loose/soft extracellular matrix. In contrast, mesenchymal migration is associated with the opposite phenotype and predominates in the dense/stiff matrix. These two movement types are highly plastic and can convert to each other, depending on the extracellular matrix type and intracellular regulation.

The collective–amoeboid transition (CMT) is a process by which collective multicellular groups dissociate into amoeboid single cells following the down-regulation of integrins. CMTs contrast with epithelial–mesenchymal transitions (EMT) which occur following a loss of E-cadherin. Like EMTs, CATs are involved in the invasion of tumor cells into surrounding tissues, with amoeboid movement more likely to occur in soft extracellular matrix (ECM) and mesenchymal movement in stiff ECM. Although once differentiated, cells typically do not change their migration mode, EMTs and CMTs are highly plastic with cells capable of interconverting between them depending on intracelluar regulatory signals and the surrounding ECM.

CATs are the least common transition type in invading tumor cells, although they are noted in melanoma explants.

== See also ==
- Collective cell migration
- Dedifferentiation
- Invasion (cancer)
