= Mir-200 =

mir-200
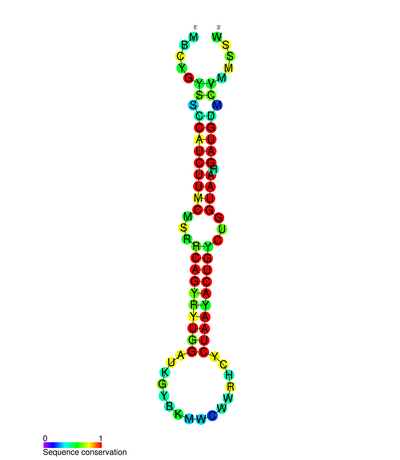
- miR-200 microRNA secondary structure and sequence conservation

Identifiers
- Symbol: mir-200
- Rfam: RF00982
- miRBase family: MIPF0000019
- NCBI Gene: 406983
- HGNC: 31578
- OMIM: 612090

Other data
- RNA type: microRNA
- Domain(s): Eukaryota; Chordata;
- PDB structures: PDBe

In molecular biology, the miR-200 microRNA is a short RNA molecule. MicroRNAs function to regulate the expression levels of other genes by binding and cleaving mRNAs or inhibiting translation. The miR-200 family contains miR-200a, miR-200b, miR-200c, miR-141, and miR-429. There is growing evidence to suggest that miR-200 microRNAs are involved in cancer metastasis.

== Genomic location ==
The five members of miR-200 are found in two clusters. In humans, miR-200a, miR-200b, and miR-429 are located on chromosome 1 and miR-200c and miR-141 are on chromosome 12. In mice, the two clusters are on chromosomes 4 and 6.

== Expression and epigenetic regulation ==
Members of the miR-200 family are highly enriched in epithelial tissues. While the mir-200 family is highly expressed in normal epithelial cells, it is not expressed in normal fibroblast cells that are of mesenchymal origin. The expression in mesenchymal cells is repressed by epigenetic marks and each cluster is repressed by a different mark. While the promoter of the cluster on chromosome 1 is occupied by polycomb specific mark H3K27me3, the promoter of the cluster on chromosome 12 is repressed by DNA methylation. DNA methylation of the mir-200c/mir-141 promoter occurs aberrantly in certain aggressive carcinoma cells that are of epithelial origin, but have undergone epithelial to mesenchymal transition and have the mir-200 family silenced.

== Association with tumour progression ==
The miR-200 family is believed to play an essential role in tumor suppression by inhibiting epithelial-mesenchymal transition (EMT), the initiating step of metastasis (Korpal). EMT occurs as part of embryonic development, and shares many similarities with cancer progression. During EMT, cells lose adhesion and increase in motility. This is characterized by repression of E-cadherin expression, which also occurs during the initial stages of metastasis.

By contrast, miR-200 has been shown to promote the last step of metastasis in which migrating cancer cells undergo MET during their colonization at distant tissues. In a series of mouse mammary isogenic cancer cell lines, the miR-200 family is highly expressed only in the cells that are able to form metastases (4T1 cells) but not in other cells which are unable to colonize (4TO7 cells). Overexpression of miR-200c in non-metastatic 4TO7 cells readily enables MET and colonization of the liver and lung.

MiR-200 targets the E-cadherin transcriptional repressors ZEB1 and ZEB2. Knockdown of miR-141 and miR-200b has been shown to reduce E-cadherin expression thus increasing cell motility and inducing EMT. Consistent with these findings, overexpression of miR-200b resulted in a decrease of endometriotic cell motility and invasive growth, associated with ZEB1 and ZEB2 downregulation and E-cadherin upregulation. Note that family members of miR-200 may have different functions due to differences in their seed regions: miR-200bc share the same seed region, while miR-200a has one nucleotide change.

=== Cancer ===
The role of miR-200 in EMT and tumor progression has been linked to several cancers including:

- Bladder cancer
- Breast cancer
- Melanoma
- Ovarian cancer
- Pancreatic cancer
- Prostate cancer
- Stomach cancer
- Lung cancer
- Colorectal cancer: MiR-200a regulates epithelial to mesenchymal transition-related gene expression and determines prognosis in colorectal cancer patients.
