= Mir-8/mir-141/mir-200 microRNA precursor family =

Precursor microRNA family

mir-8/mir-141/mir-200 microRNA precursor family
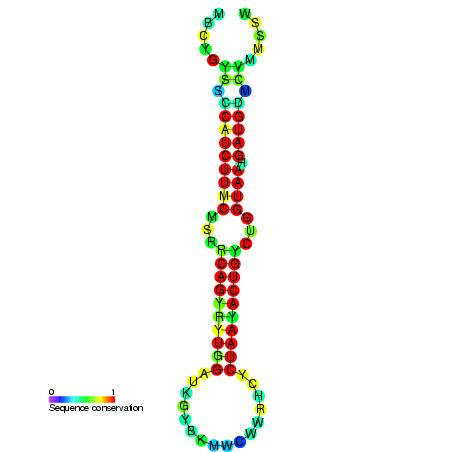
- Predicted secondary structure and sequence conservation of mir-8

Identifiers
- Symbol: mir-8
- Rfam: RF00241
- miRBase: MI0000128
- miRBase family: MIPF0000019

Other data
- RNA type: Gene; miRNA
- Domain: Eukaryota
- GO: GO:0035195 GO:0035068
- SO: SO:0001244
- PDB structures: PDBe

The miR-8 microRNA precursor (homologous to miR-141, miR-200, miR-236), is a short non-coding RNA gene involved in gene regulation. miR-8 in Drosophila melanogaster is expressed from the 3' arm of related precursor hairpins (represented here), along with miR-200, miR-236, miR-429 and human and mouse homolog miR-141. Members of this precursor family have now been predicted or experimentally confirmed in a wide range of species. The bounds of the precursors are predicted based on conservation and base pairing and are not generally known.

The miR-200 family is highly conserved in bilaterian animals, with miR-8 as the sole homolog in Drosophila. This species has accordingly been used heavily in work looking to uncover the biological function of the miR-200 family. miR-8 has been observed at all developmental stages of the embryo, and is present in cultured S2 cells of D. melanogaster. Its expression has been seen to be strongly upregulated in larvae and this expression then sustained through to adulthood.

== Targets of miR-8 ==
The atrophin gene has been shown to be a target of Drosophila miR-8., with suggestion that this target is also conserved in mammalian miR-8. Elevated atrophin activity in miR-8 mutant phenotypes has been observed, this in turn inducing elevated neural apoptosis and also behavioural defects. The atrophin mRNA increase in miR-8 mutants occurs post-transcriptionally, with miR-8 binding leading to destabilisation of atrophin mRNA. miR-8 acts to control atrophin expression in vivo directly via miR-8 sites in its 3'UTR. Indeed, a statistically significant increase in surviving adults following the removal of one copy of the atrophin gene has shown atrophin mRNA to be a functionally important target in vivo. This supports the theory that a misregulation of atrophin contributes to the defects seen in miR-8 mutants. Atrophin protein levels have additionally been found to be detectably higher in miR-8 mutant brains. The neural effects of miR-8 in miR-8-expressing cells are likely to be concentrated in miR-8-expressing neurons, therefore only acting to affect certain neuron functions.

A tuning target relationship is in place between atrophin levels and miR-8 regulation. The level of atrophin below that reached by miR-8 regulation is detrimental for the continued functioning of miR-8-expressing cells. The atrophin level here is required at an optimal level to ensure the avoidance of developmental defects arising due to decreased atrophin expression.

The human miR-200c is likely to target the Zinc Finger Transcription Factor 8 (TCF8) gene.

== Regulation of insulin signalling ==
miR-8, together with miR-200, has been identified as a regulator of insulin signalling in Drosophila fat body, the equivalent of liver and adipose tissue combined. This has led to speculation about further roles of these two members of this miRNA precursor family. mir-8 regulates body size in Drosophila in conjunction with its target USH, and the homolog miR-200 works in the same way with its respective target FOG2. Phosphoinositide 3-kinase (PI3K) is a kinase involved in a phosphorylation cascade which, once activated, works to enhance cell growth and proliferation. USH and FOG2 are able to inhibit PI3K activity through direct interaction with its regulatory subunits, dp60 and p85α respectively. This prevents the formation of an active PI3K complex. Elevated USH/F0G2 levels are observed in miR-8/200 null larvae, with a resultant downregulation in the PI3K activity of these larvae. In the presence of miR-8/200, insulin signalling in the fat body region is enhanced, and further cell size increases are seen with miR-8/200 overexpression. The effect of miR-8/200 on cell growth through insulin signalling has been found to vary in differing tissue types.
