= ZEB2-AS1 =

Identifiers
- Aliases: ZEB2-AS1, ZEB2-AS, ZEB2AS, ZEB2NAT, ZEB2 antisense RNA 1
- External IDs: GeneCards: ZEB2-AS1

Gene location (Human)
Chr.	Chromosome 2 (human)
Band	2q22.3	Start	144,517,978 bp
Band	2q22.3	End	144,521,477 bp
RNA expression pattern
Bgee	Human / Mouse (ortholog); Top expressed in: granulocyte; monocyte; corpus callosum; bone marrow cell; Achilles tendon; testicle; C1 segment; epithelium of colon; sural nerve; substantia nigra / n/a; More reference expression data
BioGPS	n/a
Orthologs
Databases	NCBI: entry; OMA: entry
Species	Human	Mouse
Entrez	100303491	n/a
Ensembl	ENSG00000238057	n/a
UniProt	n a	n/a
RefSeq (mRNA)	n/a	n/a
RefSeq (protein)	n/a	n/a
Location (UCSC)	Chr 2: 144.52 – 144.52 Mb	n/a
PubMed search		n/a
- Wikidata
View/Edit Human

ZEB2-AS1 (ZEB2 antisense RNA 1) is a long non-coding RNA, which is overlapping and antisense to the ZEB2 gene. It overlaps the 5′ splice site of an intron within the 5′UTR of the ZEB2 gene. This intron contains an internal ribosome entry site (IRES), which is necessary for ZEB2 expression. ZEB2-AS1 prevents the splicing of this intron, and therefore activates ZEB2 expression.

== See also ==
- Long noncoding RNA
