= CTDSP2 =

Protein-coding gene in humans

Identifiers
- Aliases: CTDSP2, OS4, PSR2, SCP2, CTD small phosphatase 2
- External IDs: OMIM: 608711; MGI: 1098748; GeneCards: CTDSP2
Available structures
PDB	Ortholog search: PDBe RCSB
PDB	List of PDB id codes 2Q5E
Enzyme activity
EC #	BRENDA	ExPASy	KEGG	MetaCyc
3.1.3.16	↗	↗	↗	↗

Gene location (Human)
Chr.	Chromosome 12 (human)
Band	12q14.1	Start	57,819,927 bp
Band	12q14.1	End	57,846,729 bp

Gene location (Mouse)
Chr.	Chromosome 10 (mouse)
Band	10 D3|10 74.35 cM	Start	126,814,586 bp
Band	10 D3|10 74.35 cM	End	126,835,844 bp
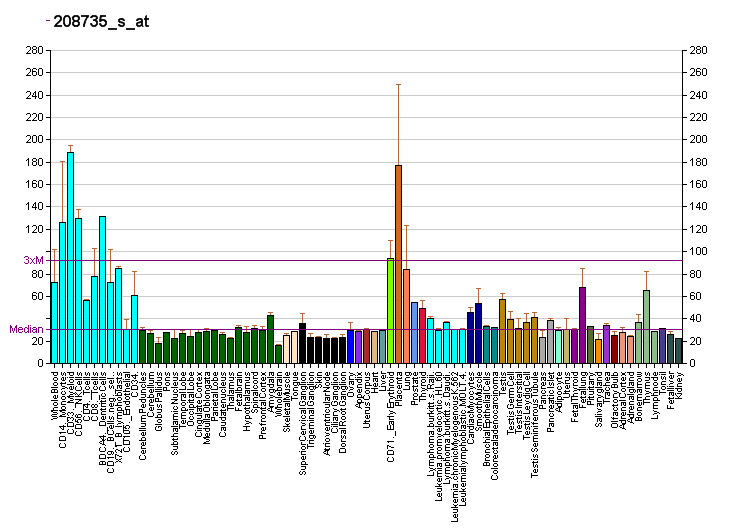
RNA expression pattern
Bgee	Human / Mouse (ortholog); Top expressed in: gastric mucosa; stromal cell of endometrium; Descending thoracic aorta; body of uterus; left ovary; right coronary artery; right lung; right ovary; left uterine tube; muscle layer of sigmoid colon / Top expressed in: ventricular zone; lip; genital tubercle; zone of skin; urinary bladder; skeletal muscle tissue; muscle of thigh; esophagus; uterus; lung; More reference expression data
BioGPS	More reference expression data
Gene ontology
Molecular function	RNA polymerase II CTD heptapeptide repeat phosphatase activity; phosphatase activity; protein binding; phosphoprotein phosphatase activity; hydrolase activity; metal ion binding
Cellular component	nucleus; nucleoplasm
Biological process	negative regulation of G1/S transition of mitotic cell cycle; negative regulation of protein phosphorylation; protein dephosphorylation; IRE1-mediated unfolded protein response; regulation of transcription by RNA polymerase II; dephosphorylation
Sources:Amigo / QuickGO
Orthologs
Databases	NCBI: entry; OMA: entry
Species	Human	Mouse
Entrez	10106	52468
Ensembl	ENSG00000175215	ENSMUSG00000078429
UniProt	O14595	Q8BX07
RefSeq (mRNA)	NM_005730	NM_001113470; NM_146012
RefSeq (protein)	NP_005721; NP_005721.3	NP_001106941; NP_666124
Location (UCSC)	Chr 12: 57.82 – 57.85 Mb	Chr 10: 126.81 – 126.84 Mb
PubMed search
- Wikidata
View/Edit Human	View/Edit Mouse

Carboxy-terminal domain RNA polymerase II polypeptide A small phosphatase 2 is an enzyme that in humans is encoded by the CTDSP2 gene.

== Interactions ==
CTDSP2 has been shown to interact with SNAI1.
