= CTDSPL =

Protein-coding gene in the species Homo sapiens

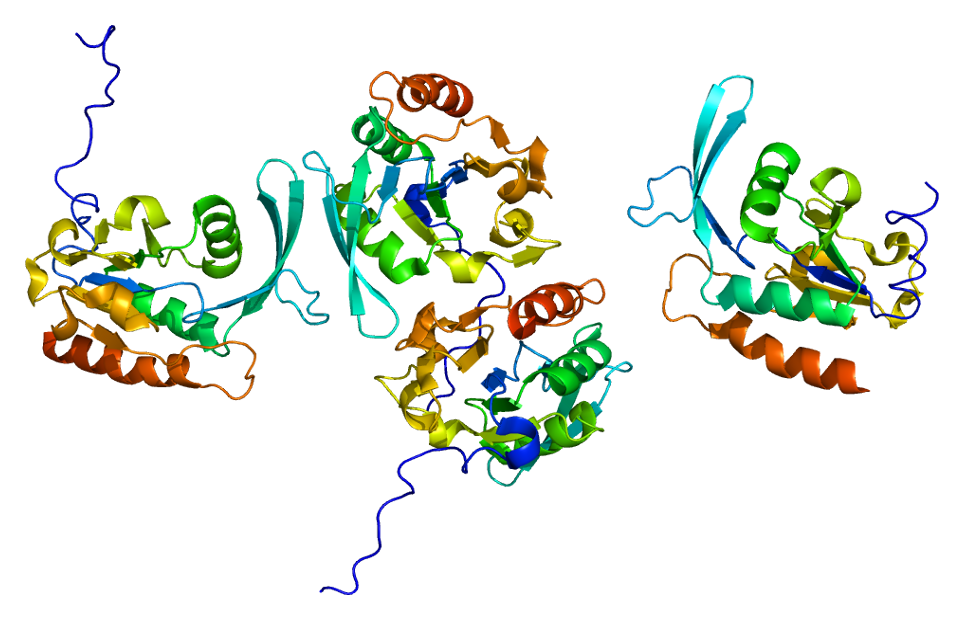

Identifiers
- Aliases: CTDSPL, C3orf8, HYA22, PSR1, RBSP3, SCP3, CTD small phosphatase like
- External IDs: OMIM: 608592; MGI: 1916524; GeneCards: CTDSPL
Available structures
PDB	Ortholog search: PDBe RCSB
PDB	List of PDB id codes 2HHL
Enzyme activity
EC #	BRENDA	ExPASy	KEGG	MetaCyc
3.1.3.16	↗	↗	↗	↗

Gene location (Human)
Chr.	Chromosome 3 (human)
Band	3p22.2	Start	37,861,880 bp
Band	3p22.2	End	37,984,469 bp

Gene location (Mouse)
Chr.	Chromosome 9 (mouse)
Band	9|9 F3	Start	118,755,521 bp
Band	9|9 F3	End	118,873,066 bp
RNA expression pattern
Bgee	Human / Mouse (ortholog); Top expressed in: metanephric glomerulus; nipple; renal medulla; parotid gland; tibia; cardia; secondary oocyte; pylorus; skin of thigh; skin of arm / Top expressed in: renal corpuscle; right lung; left lung; gastrula; right lung lobe; medullary collecting duct; left lung lobe; proximal tubule; retinal pigment epithelium; ciliary body; More reference expression data
BioGPS	n/a
Gene ontology
Molecular function	phosphatase activity; phosphoprotein phosphatase activity; hydrolase activity; metal ion binding; protein binding; molecular function; RNA polymerase II CTD heptapeptide repeat phosphatase activity
Cellular component	extracellular exosome; nucleus
Biological process	negative regulation of G1/S transition of mitotic cell cycle; negative regulation of protein phosphorylation; dephosphorylation; protein dephosphorylation; regulation of transcription by RNA polymerase II; biological process
Sources:Amigo / QuickGO
Orthologs
Databases	NCBI: entry; OMA: entry
Species	Human	Mouse
Entrez	10217	69274
Ensembl	ENSG00000144677	ENSMUSG00000047409
UniProt	O15194	P58465
RefSeq (mRNA)	NM_005808; NM_001008392	NM_133710
RefSeq (protein)	NP_001008393; NP_005799	NP_598471
Location (UCSC)	Chr 3: 37.86 – 37.98 Mb	Chr 9: 118.76 – 118.87 Mb
PubMed search
- Wikidata
View/Edit Human	View/Edit Mouse

CTD small phosphatase-like protein is an enzyme that in humans is encoded by the CTDSPL gene.

== Interactions ==
CTDSPL has been shown to interact with SNAI1.
