= CRB3 =

Protein-coding gene in the species Homo sapiens

Available structures
PDB	Ortholog search: PDBe RCSB
PDB	List of PDB id codes 5I7Z

Identifiers
- Aliases: CRB3, crumbs 3, cell polarity complex component, crumbs cell polarity complex component 3
- External IDs: OMIM: 609737; MGI: 2670904; HomoloGene: 138188; GeneCards: CRB3; OMA:CRB3 - orthologs

Gene location (Human)
Chr.	Chromosome 19 (human)
Band	19p13.3	Start	6,463,777 bp
Band	19p13.3	End	6,467,221 bp

Gene location (Mouse)
Chr.	Chromosome 17 (mouse)
Band	17|17 D	Start	57,366,105 bp
Band	17|17 D	End	57,372,918 bp
RNA expression pattern
Bgee	Human / Mouse (ortholog); Top expressed in: mucosa of pharynx; mucosa of transverse colon; vena cava; nasal epithelium; skin of arm; body of pancreas; parotid gland; body of tongue; pylorus; skin of leg / Top expressed in: yolk sac; secondary oocyte; zygote; duodenum; right kidney; stomach; morula; morula; pyloric antrum; mucous cell of stomach; More reference expression data
BioGPS	n/a
Gene ontology
Molecular function	SH3 domain binding; protein binding; protein domain specific binding
Cellular component	integral component of membrane; cell junction; plasma membrane; apical part of cell; extracellular exosome; apical plasma membrane; membrane; bicellular tight junction; protein-containing complex
Biological process	protein localization to plasma membrane; bicellular tight junction assembly
Sources:Amigo / QuickGO
Orthologs
Species	Human	Mouse
Entrez	92359	224912
Ensembl	ENSG00000130545	ENSMUSG00000044279
UniProt	Q9BUF7	Q8QZT4
RefSeq (mRNA)	NM_139161; NM_174881; NM_174882	NM_177638; NM_001347408; NM_001359813; NM_001359814
RefSeq (protein)	NP_631900; NP_777377; NP_777378	NP_001334337; NP_808306; NP_001346742; NP_001346743
Location (UCSC)	Chr 19: 6.46 – 6.47 Mb	Chr 17: 57.37 – 57.37 Mb
PubMed search
- Wikidata
View/Edit Human	View/Edit Mouse

Crumbs protein homolog 3 is a protein that in humans is encoded by the CRB3 gene.

== Function ==
This gene encodes a member of the Crumbs family of proteins. This protein may play a role in epithelial cell polarity and is associated with tight junctions at the apical surface of epithelial cells. Alternate transcriptional splice variants, encoding different isoforms, have been characterized.
