= Epithelial–mesenchymal transition =

Biological process in animal connective tissue

Epithelial-mesenchymal transition

Details
- Precursor: Endoderm

Identifiers
- MeSH: D058750

The epithelial–mesenchymal transition (EMT) is a process by which epithelial cells lose their cell polarity and cell–cell adhesion, and gain migratory and invasive properties to become mesenchymal stem cells; these are multipotent stromal cells that can differentiate into a variety of cell types. EMT is essential for numerous developmental processes including mesoderm formation and neural tube formation. EMT has also been shown to occur in wound healing, in organ fibrosis and in the initiation of metastasis in cancer progression. The inverse process is the mesenchymal-epithelial transition, a part of normal organ formation.

Despite EMT generally being recognized as a common process, the resultant mesenchymal state is not known to be associated with any specific cellular characteristic or molecular markers that are valid across all EMT proceesses as of 2020. EMT cannot be accessed solely on the basis of molecular markers.

== Introduction ==
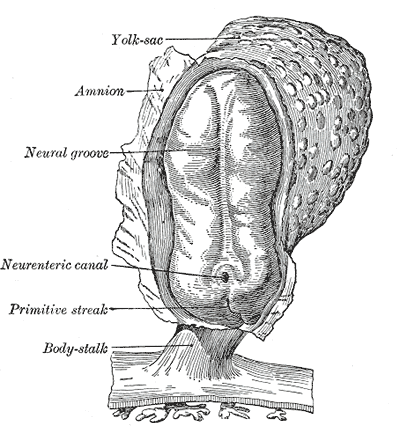
Human embryo—length, 2 mm. Dorsal view, with the amnion laid open. X 30.

Epithelial–mesenchymal transition was first recognized as a feature of embryogenesis by Betty Hay in the 1980s. EMT, and its reverse process, MET (mesenchymal-epithelial transition) are critical for development of many tissues and organs in the developing embryo, and numerous embryonic events such as gastrulation, neural crest formation, heart valve formation, secondary palate development, and myogenesis. Epithelial and mesenchymal cells differ in phenotype as well as function, though both share inherent plasticity. Epithelial cells are closely connected to each other by tight junctions, gap junctions and adherens junctions, have an apico-basal polarity, polarization of the actin cytoskeleton and are bound by a basal lamina at their basal surface. Mesenchymal cells, on the other hand, lack this polarization, have a spindle-shaped morphology and interact with each other only through focal points. Epithelial cells express high levels of E-cadherin, whereas mesenchymal cells express those of N-cadherin, fibronectin and vimentin. Thus, EMT entails profound morphological and phenotypic changes to a cell.

Based on the biological context, EMT has been categorized into 3 types: developmental (type I), fibrosis and wound healing (type II), and cancer (type III). More recently, EMT has been proposed as a driver of aging.

== Inducers ==
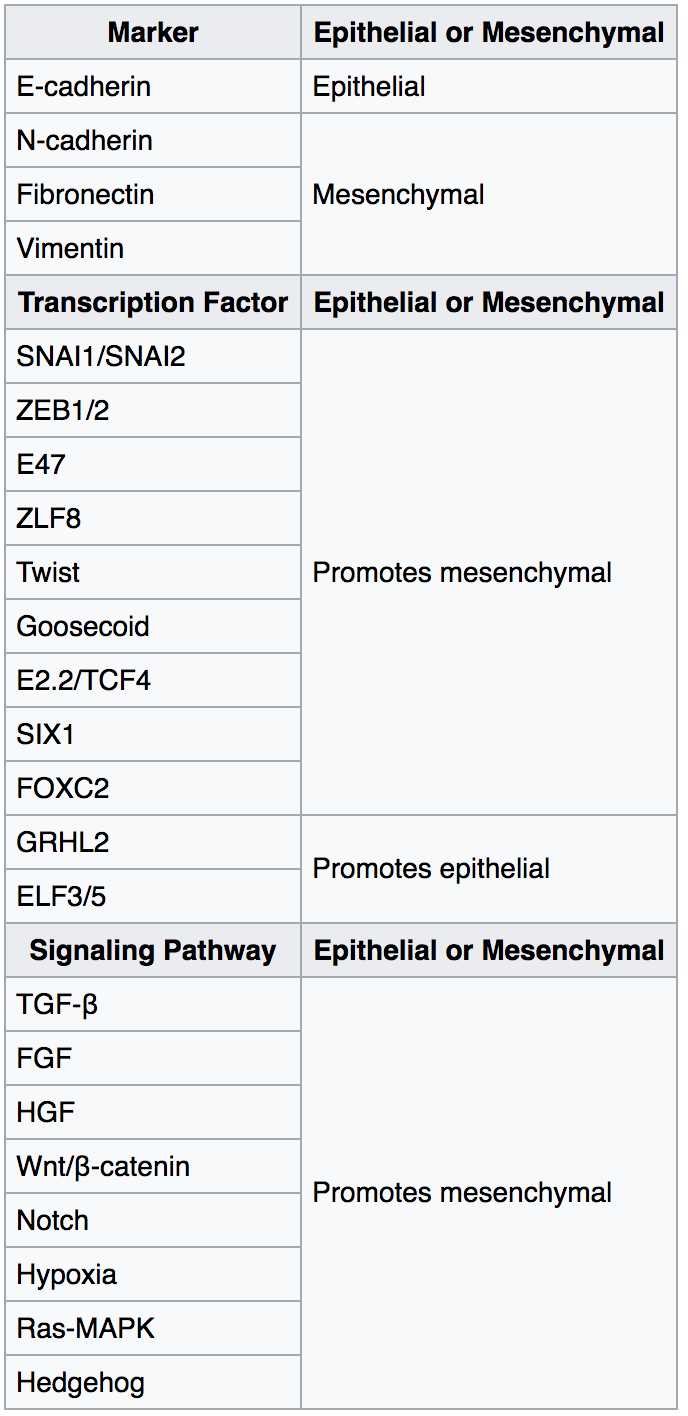
Key inducers of the epithelial to mesenchymal transition process.

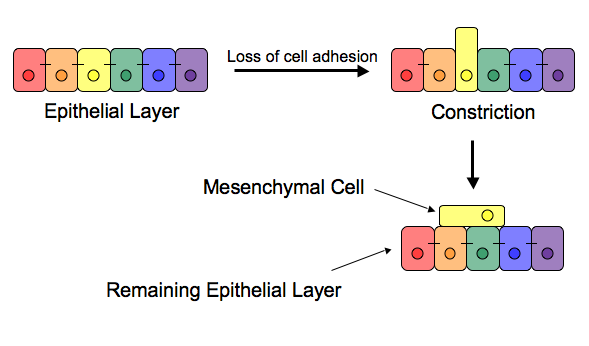
Epithelial to mesenchymal cell transition – loss of cell adhesion leads to constriction and extrusion of newly mesenchymal cell.

Loss of E-cadherin is considered to be a fundamental event in EMT. Many transcription factors (TFs) that can repress E-cadherin directly or indirectly can be considered as EMT-TF (EMT inducing TFs). SNAI1/Snail 1, SNAI2/Snail 2 (also known as Slug), ZEB1, ZEB2, TCF3 and KLF8 (Kruppel-like factor 8) can bind to the E-cadherin promoter and repress its transcription, whereas factors such as Twist, Goosecoid, TCF4 (also known as E2.2), homeobox protein SIX1 and FOXC2 (fork-head box protein C2) repress E-cadherin indirectly. SNAIL and ZEB factors bind to E-box consensus sequences on the promoter region, while KLF8 binds to promoter through GT boxes. These EMT-TFs not only directly repress E-cadherin, but also repress transcriptionally other junctional proteins, including claudins and desmosomes, thus facilitating EMT. On the other hand, transcription factors such as grainyhead-like protein 2 homologue (GRHL2), and ETS-related transcription factors ELF3 and ELF5 are downregulated during EMT and are found to actively drive MET when overexpressed in mesenchymal cells. Since EMT in cancer progression recaptures EMT in developmental programs, many of the EMT-TFs are involved in promoting metastatic events.

Several signaling pathways (TGF-β, FGF, EGF, HGF, Wnt/beta-catenin and Notch) and hypoxia may induce EMT. In particular, Ras-MAPK has been shown to activate Snail and Slug. Slug triggers the steps of desmosomal disruption, cell spreading, and partial separation at cell–cell borders, which comprise the first and necessary phase of the EMT process. On the other hand, Slug cannot trigger the second phase, which includes the induction of cell motility, repression of the cytokeratin expression, and activation of vimentin expression. Snail and Slug are known to regulate the expression of p63 isoforms, another transcription factor that is required for proper development of epithelial structures. The altered expression of p63 isoforms reduced cell–cell adhesion and increased the migratory properties of cancer cells. The p63 factor is involved in inhibiting EMT and reduction of certain p63 isoforms may be important in the development of epithelial cancers. Some of them are known to regulate the expression of cytokeratins. The phosphatidylinositol 3' kinase (PI3K)/AKT axis, Hedgehog signaling pathway, nuclear factor-kappaB and activating transcription factor 2 have also been implicated to be involved in EMT.

Wnt signaling pathway regulates EMT in gastrulation, cardiac valve formation and cancer. Activation of Wnt pathway in breast cancer cells induces the EMT regulator SNAIL and upregulates the mesenchymal marker, vimentin. Also, active Wnt/beta-catenin pathway correlates with poor prognosis in breast cancer patients in the clinic. Similarly, TGF-β activates the expression of SNAIL and ZEB to regulate EMT in heart development, palatogenesis, and cancer. The breast cancer bone metastasis has activated TGF-β signaling, which contributes to the formation of these lesions. However, on the other hand, p53, a well-known tumor suppressor, represses EMT by activating the expression of various microRNAs – miR-200 and miR-34 that inhibit the production of protein ZEB and SNAIL, and thus maintain the epithelial phenotype.

== In development and wound healing ==
After the initial stage of embryogenesis, the implantation of the embryo and the initiation of placenta formation are associated with EMT. The trophoectoderm cells undergo EMT to facilitate the invasion of endometrium and appropriate placenta placement, thus enabling nutrient and gas exchange to the embryo. Later in embryogenesis, during gastrulation, EMT allows the cells to ingress in a specific area of the embryo – the primitive streak in amniotes, and the ventral furrow in Drosophila. The cells in this tissue express E-cadherin and apical-basal polarity. Since gastrulation is a very rapid process, E-cadherin is repressed transcriptionally by Twist and SNAI1 (commonly called Snail), and at the protein level by P38 interacting protein. The primitive streak, through invagination, further generates mesoendoderm, which separates to form a mesoderm and an endoderm, again through EMT. Mesenchymal cells from the primitive streak participate also in the formation of many epithelial mesodermal organs, such as notochord as well as somites, through the reverse of EMT, i.e. mesenchymal–epithelial transition. Amphioxus forms an epithelial neural tube and dorsal notochord but does not have the EMT potential of the primitive streak. In higher chordates, the mesenchyme originates out of the primitive streak migrates anteriorly to form the somites and participate with neural crest mesenchyme in formation of the heart mesoderm.

In vertebrates, epithelium and mesenchyme are the basic tissue phenotypes. During embryonic development, migratory neural crest cells are generated by EMT involving the epithelial cells of the neuroectoderm. As a result, these cells dissociate from neural folds, gain motility, and disseminate to various parts of the embryo, where they differentiate to many other cell types. Also, craniofacial crest mesenchyme that forms the connective tissue forming the head and face, is formed by neural tube epithelium by EMT. EMT takes place during the construction of the vertebral column out of the extracellular matrix, which is to be synthesized by fibroblasts and osteoblasts that encircle the neural tube. The major source of these cells are sclerotome and somite mesenchyme as well as primitive streak. Mesenchymal morphology allows the cells to travel to specific targets in the embryo, where they differentiate and/or induce differentiation of other cells.

During wound healing, keratinocytes at the border of the wound undergo EMT and undergo re-epithelialization or MET when the wound is closed. Snail2 expression at the migratory front influences this state, as its overexpression accelerates wound healing. Similarly, in each menstrual cycle, the ovarian surface epithelium undergoes EMT during post-ovulatory wound healing.

== In cancer progression and metastasis ==
Initiation of metastasis requires invasion, which is enabled by EMT. Carcinoma cells in a primary tumor lose cell-cell adhesion mediated by E-cadherin repression and break through the basement membrane with increased invasive properties, and enter the bloodstream through intravasation. Later, when these circulating tumor cells (CTCs) exit the bloodstream to form micro-metastases, they undergo MET for clonal outgrowth at these metastatic sites. Thus, EMT and MET form the initiation and completion of the invasion-metastasis cascade. At this new metastatic site, the tumor may undergo other processes to optimize growth. For example, EMT has been associated with PD-L1 expression, particularly in lung cancer. Increased levels of PD-L1 suppresses the immune system which allows the cancer to spread more easily.

EMT confers resistance to oncogene-induced premature senescence. Twist1 and Twist2, as well as ZEB1 protects human cells and mouse embryonic fibroblasts from senescence. Similarly, TGF-β can promote tumor invasion and evasion of immune surveillance at advanced stages. When TGF-β acts on activated Ras-expressing mammary epithelial cells, EMT is favored and apoptosis is inhibited. This effect can be reversed by inducers of epithelial differentiation, such as GATA-3.

EMT has been shown to be induced by androgen deprivation therapy in metastatic prostate cancer. Activation of EMT programs via inhibition of the androgen axis provides a mechanism by which tumor cells can adapt to promote disease recurrence and progression. Brachyury, Axl, MEK, and Aurora kinase A are molecular drivers of these programs, and inhibitors are currently in clinical trials to determine therapeutic applications. Oncogenic PKC-iota can promote melanoma cell invasion by activating Vimentin during EMT. PKC-iota inhibition or knockdown resulted an increase E-cadherin and RhoA levels while decreasing total Vimentin, phosphorylated Vimentin (S39) and Par6 in metastatic melanoma cells. These results suggested that PKC-ι is involved in signaling pathways which upregulate EMT in melanoma.

EMT has been indicated to be involved in acquiring drug resistance. Gain of EMT markers was found to be associated with the resistance of ovarian carcinoma epithelial cell lines to paclitaxel. Similarly, SNAIL also confers resistance to paclitaxel, adriamycin and radiotherapy by inhibiting p53-mediated apoptosis. Furthermore, inflammation, that has been associated with the progression of cancer and fibrosis, was recently shown to be related to cancer through inflammation-induced EMT. Consequently, EMT enables cells to gain a migratory phenotype, as well as induce multiple immunosuppression, drug resistance, evasion of apoptosis mechanisms.

Some evidence suggests that cells that undergo EMT gain stem cell-like properties, thus giving rise to Cancer Stem Cells (CSCs). Upon transfection by activated Ras, a subpopulation of cells exhibiting the putative stem cell markers CD44high/CD24low increases with the concomitant induction of EMT. Also, ZEB1 is capable of conferring stem cell-like properties, thus strengthening the relationship between EMT and stemness. Thus, EMT may present increased danger to cancer patients, as EMT not only enables the carcinoma cells to enter the bloodstream, but also endows them with properties of stemness which increases tumorigenic and proliferative potential.

However, recent studies have further shifted the primary effects of EMT away from invasion and metastasis, toward resistance to chemotherapeutic agents. Research on breast cancer and pancreatic cancer both demonstrated no difference in cells' metastatic potential upon acquisition of EMT. These are in agreement with another study showing that the EMT transcription factor TWIST actually requires intact adherens junctions in order to mediate local invasion in breast cancer. The effects of EMT and its relationship to invasion and metastasis may therefore be highly context specific.

In urothelial carcinoma cell lines overexpression of HDAC5 inhibits long-term proliferation but can promote epithelial-to-mesenchymal transition (EMT).

== Platelets in cancer EMT ==
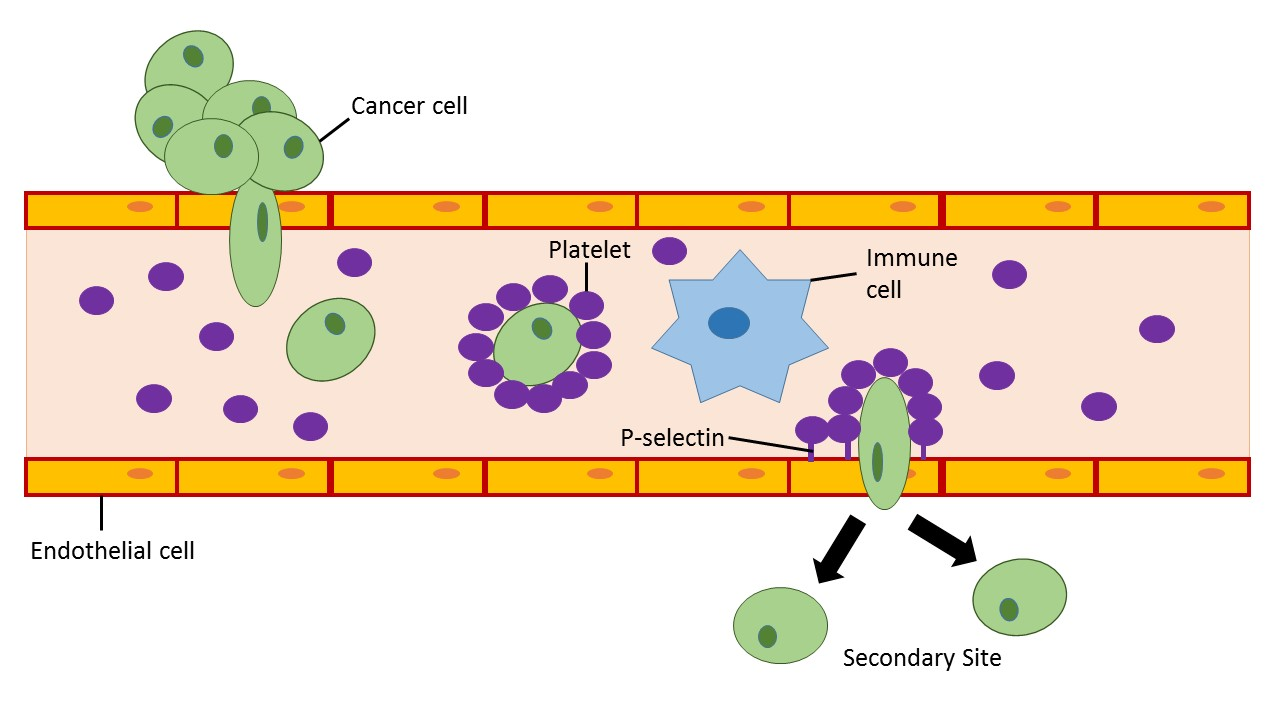
Cancer cells enter the bloodstream after undergoing EMT induced by TGF-β released from platelets. Once in the bloodstream, metastatic cancer cells recruit platelets for use as a physical barrier that helps protect these cells from elimination by immune cells. The metastatic cancer cell can use the attached platelets to adhere to P-selectin expressed by activated endothelial cells lining the blood vessel walls. Following adhesion to the endothelium, the metastatic cancer cell exits the bloodstream at the secondary site to begin formation of a new tumor.

Platelets in the blood have the ability to initiate the induction of EMT in cancer cells. When platelets are recruited to a site in the blood vessel they can release a variety of growth factors (PDGF, VEGF, Angiopoietin-1) and cytokines including the EMT inducer TGF-β. The release of TGF-β by platelets in blood vessels near primary tumors enhances invasiveness and promotes metastasis of cancer cells in the tumor. Studies looking at defective platelets and reduced platelet counts in mouse models have shown that impaired platelet function is associated with decreased metastatic formation. In humans, platelet counts and thrombocytosis within the upper end of the normal range have been associated with advanced, often metastatic, stage cancer in cervical cancer, ovarian cancer, gastric cancer, and esophageal cancer. Although a great deal of research has been applied to studying interactions between tumor cells and platelets, a cancer therapy targeting this interaction has not yet been established. This may be in part due to the redundancy of prothrombotic pathways which would require the use of multiple therapeutic approaches in order to prevent pro-metastatic events via EMT induction in cancer cells by activated platelets.

To improve the chances for the development of a cancer metastasis, a cancer cell must avoid detection and targeting by the immune system once it enters the bloodstream. Activated platelets have the ability to bind glycoproteins and glycolipids (P-selectin ligands such as PSGL-1) on the surface of cancer cells to form a physical barrier that protects the cancer cell from natural killer cell-mediated lysis in the bloodstream. Furthermore, activated platelets promote the adhesion of cancer cells to activated endothelial cells lining blood vessels using adhesion molecules present on platelets. P-selectin ligands on the surface of cancer cells remain to be elucidated and may serve as potential biomarkers for disease progression in cancer.

== Therapeutics targeting cancer EMT ==
Many studies have proposed that induction of EMT is the primary mechanism by which epithelial cancer cells acquire malignant phenotypes that promote metastasis. Drug development targeting the activation of EMT in cancer cells has thus become an aim of pharmaceutical companies.

=== Small molecule inhibitors ===
Small molecules that are able to inhibit TGF-β induced EMT are under development. Silmitasertib (CX-4945) is a small molecule inhibitor of protein kinase CK2, which has been supported to be linked with TGF-β induced EMT, and is currently in clinical trials for cholangiocarcinoma (bile duct cancer), as well as in preclinical development for hematological and lymphoid malignancies. In January 2017, Silmitasertib was granted orphan drug status by the U.S. Food and Drug Administration for cholangiocarcinoma and is currently in phase II study. Silmitasertib is being developed by Senhwa Biosciences. Another small molecule inhibitor Galunisertib (LY2157299) is a potent TGF-β type I receptor kinase inhibitor that was demonstrated to reduce the size, the growth rate of tumors, and the tumor forming potential in triple negative breast cancer cell lines using mouse xenografts. Galunisertib is currently being developed by Lilly Oncology and is in phase I/II clinical trials for hepatocellular carcinoma, unresectable pancreatic cancer, and malignant glioma. Small molecule inhibitors of EMT are suggested to not act as a replacement for traditional chemotherapeutic agents but are likely to display the greatest efficacy in treating cancers when used in conjunction with them.

Antagomirs and microRNA mimics have gained interest as a potential source of therapeutics to target EMT induced metastasis in cancer as well as treating many other diseases. Antagomirs were first developed to target miR-122, a microRNA that was abundant and specific to the liver, and this discovery has led to the development of other antagomirs that can pair with specific microRNAs present in the tumor microenvironment or in the cancer cells. A microRNA mimic to miR-655 was found to suppress EMT through the targeting of EMT inducing transcription factor ZEB1 and TGF-β receptor 2 in a pancreatic cancer cell line. Overexpression of the miR-655 mimic in the Panc1 cancer cell line upregulated the expression of E-cadherin and suppressed the migration and invasion of mesenchymal-like cancer cells. The use of microRNA mimics to suppress EMT has expanded to other cancer cell lines and holds potential for clinical drug development. However, microRNA mimics and antagomirs suffer from a lack of stability in vivo and lack an accurate delivery system to target these molecules to the tumor cells or tissue for treatment. Improvements to antagomir and microRNA mimic stability through chemical modifications such as locked nucleic acid (LNA) oligonucleotides or peptide nucleic acids (PNA) can prevent the fast clearing of these small molecules by RNases. Delivery of antagomirs and microRNA mimics into cells by enclosing these molecules in liposome-nanoparticles has generated interest however liposome structures suffer from their own drawbacks that will need to be overcome for their effective use as a drug delivery mechanism. These drawbacks of liposome-nanoparticles include nonspecific uptake by cells and induction of immune responses. The role that microRNAs play in cancer development and metastasis is under much scientific investigation and it is yet to be demonstrated whether microRNA mimics or antagomirs may serve as standard clinical treatments to suppress EMT or oncogenic microRNAs in cancers.

== Generation of endocrine progenitor cells from pancreatic islets ==
Similar to generation of Cancer Stem Cells, EMT was demonstrated to generate endocrine progenitor cells from human pancreatic islets. Initially, the human islet-derived progenitor cells (hIPCs) were proposed to be better precursors since β-cell progeny in these hIPCs inherit epigenetic marks that define an active insulin promoter region. However, later, another set of experiments suggested that labelled β-cells de-differentiate to a mesenchymal-like phenotype in vitro, but fail to proliferate; thus initiating a debate in 2007.

Since these studies in human islets lacked lineage-tracing analysis, these findings from irreversibly tagged beta cells in mice were extrapolated to human islets. Thus, using a dual lentiviral and genetic lineage tracing system to label β-cells, it was convincingly demonstrated that adult human islet β-cells undergo EMT and proliferate in vitro. Also, these findings were confirmed in human fetal pancreatic insulin-producing cells, and the mesenchymal cells derived from pancreatic islets can undergo the reverse of EMT – MET – to generate islet-like cell aggregates. Thus, the concept of generating progenitors from insulin-producing cells by EMT or generation of Cancer Stem Cells during EMT in cancer may have potential for replacement therapy in diabetes, and call for drugs targeting inhibition of EMT in cancer.

== Partial EMT or a hybrid E/M phenotype ==
Not all cells undergo a complete EMT, i.e. losing their cell-cell adhesion and gaining solitary migration characteristics. Instead, most cells undergo partial EMT, a state in which they retain some epithelial traits such as cell-cell adhesion or apico-basal polarity, and gain migratory traits, thus cells in this hybrid epithelial/mesenchymal (E/M) phenotype are endowed with special properties such as collective cell migration. Single-cell tracking contributes to enabling the visualization of morphological transitions during EMT, the discernment of cell migration phenotypes, and the correlation of the heritability of these traits among sister cells. Two mathematical models have been proposed, attempting to explain the emergence of this hybrid E/M phenotype, and its highly likely that different cell lines adopt different hybrid state(s), as shown by experiments in MCF10A, HMLE and H1975 cell lines. Although a hybrid E/M state has been referred to as 'metastable' or transient, recent experiments in H1975 cells suggest that this state can be stably maintained by cells.

== Criticism ==
The concepts of EMT and MET has been criticized for not having clearly defined start and end states, specific molecular changes universal across the categories, and/or over-interpreting the phenotype change in cancer cells.

== See also ==
- Collective cell migration
- Collective–amoeboid transition
- c-Met inhibitors
- Vasculogenic Mimicry
