= SNAI1 =

Protein

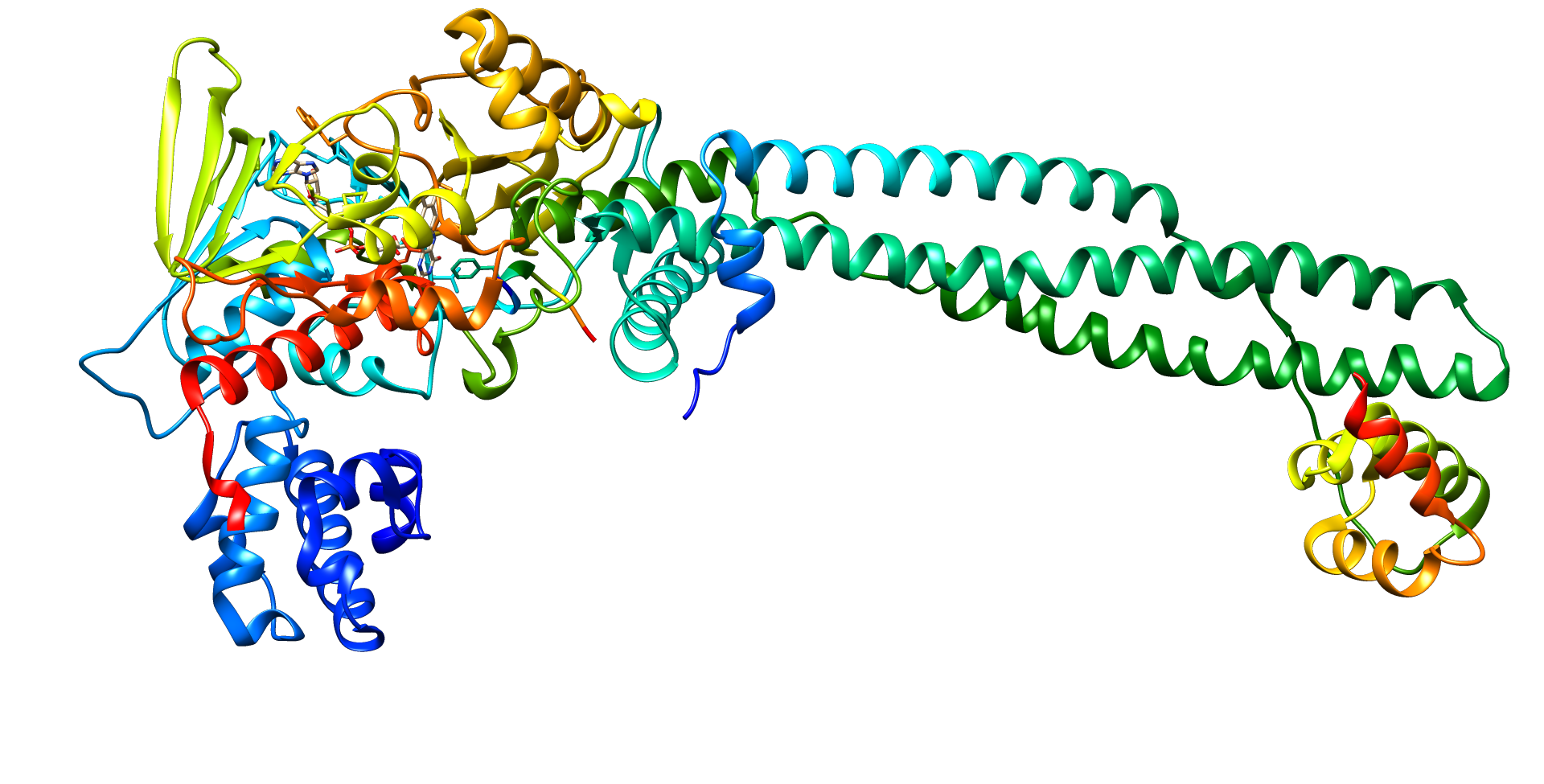

Identifiers
- Aliases: SNAI1, SLUGH2, SNA, SNAH, SNAIL, SNAIL1, dJ710H13.1, snail family zinc finger 1, snail family transcriptional repressor 1
- External IDs: OMIM: 604238; MGI: 98330; GeneCards: SNAI1
Available structures
PDB	Ortholog search: PDBe RCSB
PDB	List of PDB id codes 2Y48, 3W5K, 4QLI

Gene location (Human)
Chr.	Chromosome 20 (human)
Band	20q13.13	Start	49,982,980 bp
Band	20q13.13	End	49,988,886 bp

Gene location (Mouse)
Chr.	Chromosome 2 (mouse)
Band	2 H3|2 87.33 cM	Start	167,380,115 bp
Band	2 H3|2 87.33 cM	End	167,384,734 bp
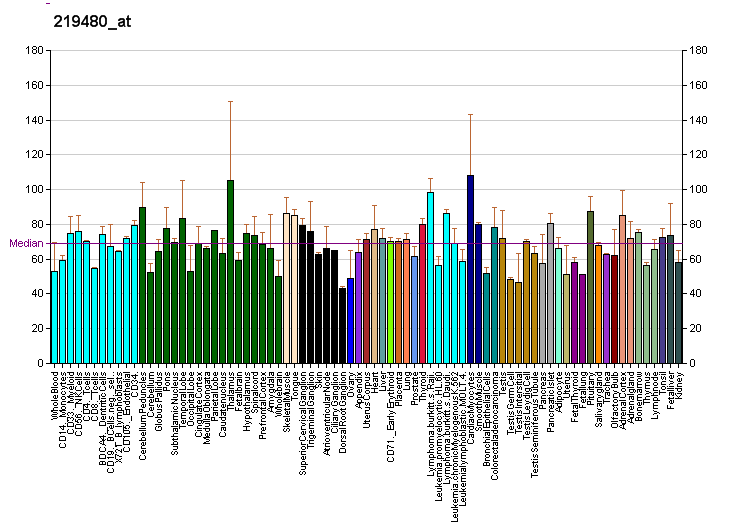
RNA expression pattern
Bgee	Human / Mouse (ortholog); Top expressed in: gallbladder; left uterine tube; gonad; right lobe of thyroid gland; left lobe of thyroid gland; ascending aorta; upper lobe of left lung; right lung; left coronary artery; right auricle of heart / Top expressed in: lamina propria of urethra; neural crest; tail of embryo; lamina propria of vagina; desmocranium; mesoderm; embryo; Primary palate; granulocyte; calvaria; More reference expression data
BioGPS	More reference expression data
Gene ontology
Molecular function	sequence-specific DNA binding; DNA binding; RNA polymerase II transcription regulatory region sequence-specific DNA binding; metal ion binding; kinase binding; protein binding; DNA-binding transcription repressor activity, RNA polymerase II-specific; nucleic acid binding; DNA-binding transcription factor activity, RNA polymerase II-specific; E-box binding
Cellular component	nucleus; cytoplasm; nucleoplasm; pericentric heterochromatin; cytosol
Biological process	trophoblast giant cell differentiation; roof of mouth development; regulation of bicellular tight junction assembly; positive regulation of cell migration; regulation of transcription by RNA polymerase II; epithelial to mesenchymal transition involved in endocardial cushion formation; negative regulation of intrinsic apoptotic signaling pathway in response to DNA damage; multicellular organism development; negative regulation of vitamin D biosynthetic process; positive regulation of transcription, DNA-templated; negative regulation of DNA damage response, signal transduction by p53 class mediator; osteoblast differentiation; negative regulation of cell differentiation involved in embryonic placenta development; cartilage morphogenesis; hair follicle morphogenesis; left/right pattern formation; mesoderm development; negative regulation of transcription, DNA-templated; cell migration; negative regulation of transcription by RNA polymerase II; Notch signaling involved in heart development; mesoderm formation; epithelial to mesenchymal transition; positive regulation of epithelial to mesenchymal transition; heterochromatin organization; aortic valve morphogenesis
Sources:Amigo / QuickGO
Orthologs
Databases	NCBI: entry; OMA: entry
Species	Human	Mouse
Entrez	6615	20613
Ensembl	ENSG00000124216	ENSMUSG00000042821
UniProt	O95863	Q02085
RefSeq (mRNA)	NM_005985	NM_011427
RefSeq (protein)	NP_005976	NP_035557
Location (UCSC)	Chr 20: 49.98 – 49.99 Mb	Chr 2: 167.38 – 167.38 Mb
PubMed search
- Wikidata
View/Edit Human	View/Edit Mouse

Zinc finger protein SNAI1 (sometimes referred to as Snail) is a protein that in humans is encoded by the SNAI1 gene. Snail is a family of transcription factors that promote the repression of the adhesion molecule E-cadherin to regulate epithelial to mesenchymal transition (EMT) during embryonic development.

== Function ==
The Drosophila embryonic protein SNAI1, commonly known as Snail, is a zinc finger transcriptional repressor which downregulates the expression of ectodermal genes within the mesoderm. The nuclear protein encoded by this gene is structurally similar to the Drosophila Snail protein, and is also thought to be critical for mesoderm formation in the developing embryo. At least two variants of a similar processed pseudogene have been found on chromosome 2. SNAI1 zinc-fingers (ZF) binds to E-box, an E-cadherin promoter region, and represses the expression of the adhesion molecule, which induces the tightly bound epithelial cells to break loose from each other and migrate into the developing embryo to become mesenchymal cells. This process allows for the formation of the mesodermal layer in the developing embryo. Though SNAI1 is shown to repress expression of E-cadherin in epithelial cells, studies have shown homozygous mutant embryos are still able to form a mesodermal layer. However, the mesodermal layer present shows characteristics of epithelial cells and not mesenchymal cells (the mutant mesoderm cells exhibited a polarized state). Other studies show that mutation of specific ZFs contribute to a decrease in SNAI1 E-cadherin repression.

SNAI1 and other epithelial-mesenchymal transition (EMT) genes are regulated by several genes and molecules including Wnt and prostaglandins. Wnt3a is a master regulator of paraxial presomatic mesoderm cells (PSM) which differentiate into the musculoskeleton of the trunk and tail. Other genes, most of which act downstream of Wnt include Msx1, Pax3, and Mesogenin 1 (Msgn1). Msgn1 activates SNAI1 by binding to its enhancer and activating SNAI1 to induce EMT. MSGN1 also regulates many of the same genes as SNAI1 to ensure EMT activation, granting the system redundancy. This suggests that Msgn1 and SNAI1 act together through a feed forward mechanism. When Msgn1 is deleted, the mesodermal progenitors do not move from the primitive streak (PS) but still show mesenchymal morphology. This suggests that the Msgn1/SNAI1 axis mostly functions to drive cell movement. Prostaglandin E2 (PE2), an important hormone in homeostasis and maintaining normal fertility and pregnancy, stabilizes SNAI1 post-transcriptionally and, therefore, also plays a role in embryogenesis. When the prostaglandin signaling pathway is compromised, SNAI1 transcriptional repressor activity decreases, increasing E-cadherin protein levels during gastrulation. However, this does not prevent gastrulation from occurring.

== Clinical significance ==
Snail gene may show a role in recurrence of breast cancer by downregulating E-cadherin and inducing an epithelial to mesenchymal transition. The process of EMT is also noted as an important and noteworthy process in tumor growth, through the invasion and metastasis of tumor cells due to repression of E-cadherin adhesion molecules. Through knockout models, one study has shown the importance of SNAI1 in the growth of breast cancer cells. Knockout models showed significant reduction in cancer invasiveness and therefore can be used as a therapeutic measure for the treatment of breast cancer before chemotherapy treatment.

== Interactions ==
SNAI1 has been shown to interact with CTDSPL, CTDSP1 and CTDSP2. Snail1 affects cell polarity by interacting with members of the Crumbs family including CRUMBS3 and CRB1.
