= Intravasation =

Invasion of cancer cells into a blood or lymphatic vessel

Intravasation is the invasion of cancer cells through the basement membrane into a blood or lymphatic vessel. Intravasation is one of several carcinogenic events that initiate the escape of cancerous cells from their primary sites. Other mechanisms include invasion through basement membranes, extravasation, and colonization of distant metastatic sites. Cancer cell chemotaxis also relies on this migratory behavior to arrive at a secondary destination designated for cancer cell colonization.

== Contributing factors ==
One of the genes that contributes to intravasation codes for urokinase (uPA), a serine protease that is able to proteolytically degrade various extracellular matrix (ECM) components and the basement membrane around primary tumors. uPA also activates multiple growth factors and matrix metalloproteinases (MMPs) that further contribute to ECM degradation, thus enabling tumor cell invasion and intravasation.

A newly identified metastasis suppressor, p75 neurotrophin receptor (p75NTR), is able to suppress metastasis in part by causing specific proteases, such as uPA, to be downregulated.

Tumor-associated macrophages (TAMs) have been shown to be abundantly present in the microenvironments of metastasizing tumors. Studies have revealed that macrophages enhance tumor cell migration and intravasation by secreting chemotactic and chemokinetic factors, promoting angiogenesis, remodeling the ECM, and regulating the formation of collagen fibers.

Groups of three cell types (a macrophage, an endothelial cell, and a tumor cell) collectively known as tumor microenvironment of metastasis (TMEM) can allow tumor cells to enter blood vessels.

== Active and passive intravasation ==
Tumors can use both active and passive methods to enter the vasculature. Some studies suggest that cancer cells actively move towards blood or lymphatic vessels in response to nutrient or chemokine gradients, while others provide evidence for the hypothesis that metastasis in its early stages is more of a random behavior.

In active intravasation, cancerous cells actively migrate toward and then into nearby blood vessels. The first step in this process is specific adhesion to venous endothelial cells, followed by adherence to proteins of the subendothelial basement membrane, such as laminin and types IV and V collagen. The final step is the adhesion of the metastatic tumor cell to connective tissue elements such as fibronectin, type I collagen, and hyaluronan, which is required for the movement of the tumor cell into the subendothelial stroma and subsequent growth at the secondary site of colonization.

Passive intravasation refers to a process in which tumors metastasize through passive shedding. Evidence for this is seen when the number of tumor cells released into the circulation increases when the primary tumor experiences trauma. Cells growing in restricted spaces have been shown to push against each other, causing blood and lymphatic vessels to flatten, potentially forcing cells into the vessels.

== Epithelial–mesenchymal transition and intravasation ==
Epithelial–mesenchymal transition (EMT) has been hypothesized to be an absolute requirement for tumor invasion and metastasis, although both EMT and non-EMT cells have been shown to cooperate to complete the spontaneous metastasis process. EMT cells with migratory phenotype degrade the ECM and penetrate local tissue and blood or lymphatic vessels, thereby facilitating intravasation. Non-EMT cells can migrate together with EMT cells to enter the blood or lymphatic vessels. Although both cell types persist in circulation, EMT cells fail to adhere to the vessel wall at the secondary site, while non-EMT cells, which have greater adhesive properties, are able to attach to the vessel wall and extravasate into the secondary site.
