= Diffusion gradient =

Gradient in the rates of molecular diffusion

A diffusion gradient is a gradient in the rates of diffusion of multiple groups of molecules through a medium or substrate. The groups of molecules may constitute multiple substances, portions of the same substance that have different temperatures, or other differentiable groupings. The analysis of diffusion gradients has applications in many sciences and technologies, as described for the following contexts:

- Double diffusive convection, in which density differences, often reflecting temperature differences, affect fluid flows
- Diffusion MRI, which visualizes tissues on the basis of diffusion gradients of various molecules, especially water molecules
- Immunodiffusion, which can use diffusion rate differentials to separate multiple immune complex species
