= ZEB1 =

Protein-coding gene in the species Homo sapiens

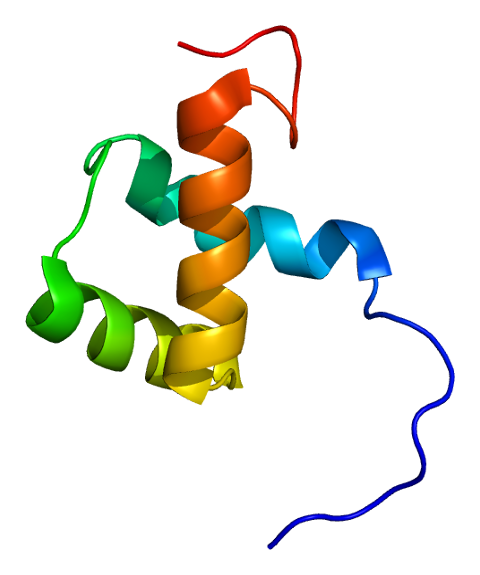

Identifiers
- Aliases: ZEB1, zinc finger E-box binding homeobox 1, AREB6, BZP, DELTAEF1, FECD6, NIL2A, PPCD3, TCF8, ZFHEP, ZFHX1A
- External IDs: OMIM: 189909; MGI: 1344313; GeneCards: ZEB1
Available structures
PDB	Ortholog search: PDBe RCSB
PDB	List of PDB id codes 2E19

Gene location (Human)
Chr.	Chromosome 10 (human)
Band	10p11.22	Start	31,318,495 bp
Band	10p11.22	End	31,529,814 bp

Gene location (Mouse)
Chr.	Chromosome 18 (mouse)
Band	18 4.42 cM|18 A1	Start	5,591,860 bp
Band	18 4.42 cM|18 A1	End	5,775,467 bp
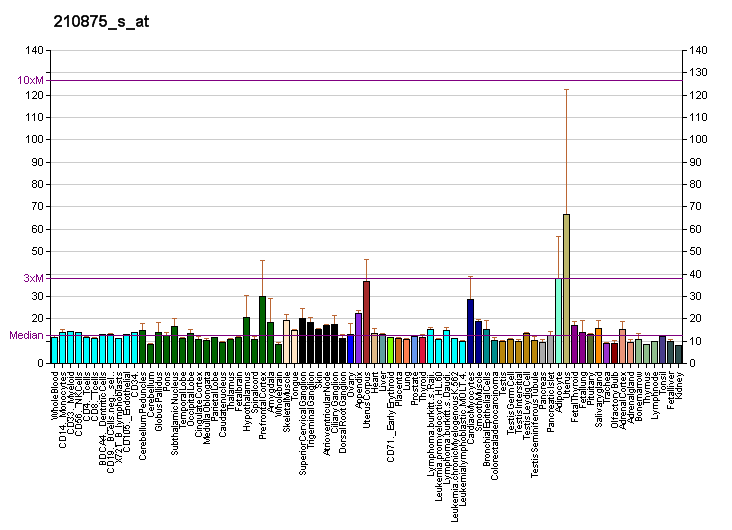

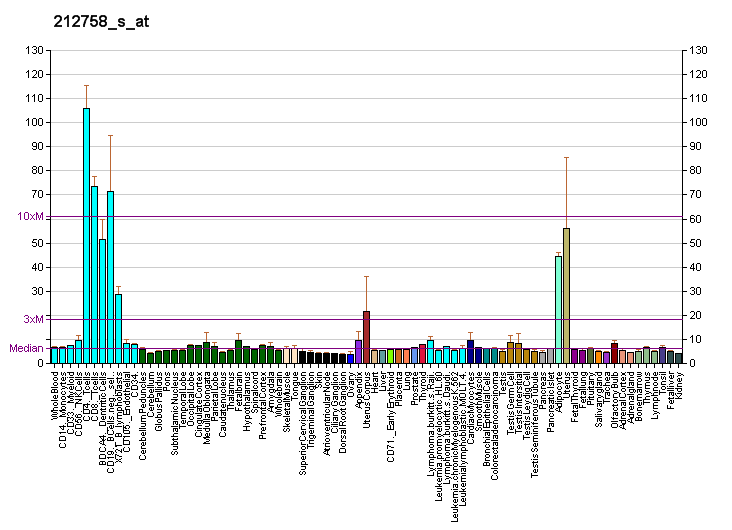

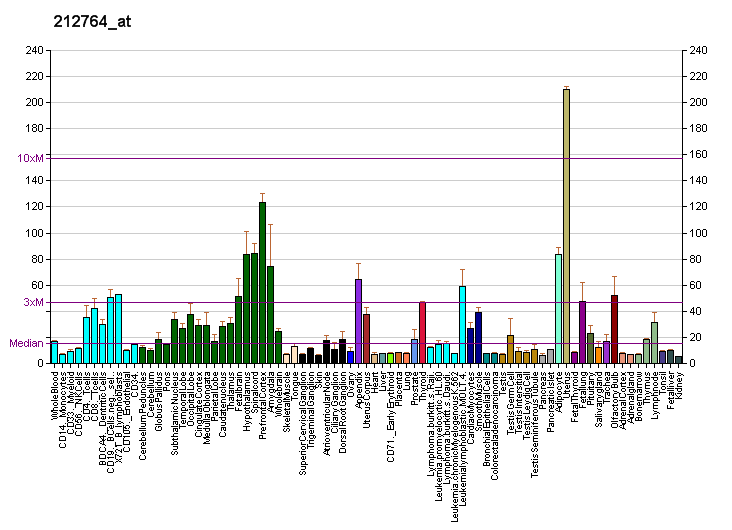
RNA expression pattern
Bgee	Human / Mouse (ortholog); Top expressed in: Achilles tendon; epithelium of colon; decidua; optic nerve; glutes; endothelial cell; Skeletal muscle tissue of rectus abdominis; biceps brachii; tendon of biceps brachii; Skeletal muscle tissue of biceps brachii / Top expressed in: internal carotid artery; substantia nigra; motor neuron; external carotid artery; semi-lunar valve; carotid body; ascending aorta; Rostral migratory stream; suprachiasmatic nucleus; Gonadal ridge; More reference expression data
BioGPS	More reference expression data
Gene ontology
Molecular function	DNA binding; transcription corepressor activity; transcription coactivator activity; zinc ion binding; transcription factor binding; chromatin binding; metal ion binding; protein binding; nucleic acid binding; DNA-binding transcription repressor activity, RNA polymerase II-specific; DNA-binding transcription factor activity; E-box binding; DNA-binding transcription factor activity, RNA polymerase II-specific
Cellular component	transcription regulator complex; nucleus; nucleoplasm; cytosol
Biological process	pattern specification process; embryonic skeletal system morphogenesis; regulation of smooth muscle cell differentiation; animal organ development; cell differentiation; semicircular canal morphogenesis; regulation of transcription, DNA-templated; regulation of transcription by RNA polymerase II; transcription, DNA-templated; nervous system development; regulation of transforming growth factor beta receptor signaling pathway; regulation of T cell differentiation in thymus; central nervous system development; cartilage development; regulation of mesenchymal cell proliferation; embryonic camera-type eye morphogenesis; cochlea morphogenesis; immune response; embryonic morphogenesis; cellular response to amino acid stimulus; cell population proliferation; negative regulation of epithelial cell differentiation; positive regulation of transcription by RNA polymerase II; negative regulation of cell population proliferation; negative regulation of transcription, DNA-templated; positive regulation of neuron differentiation; negative regulation of transcription by RNA polymerase II; negative regulation of endothelial cell differentiation; cytokine-mediated signaling pathway
Sources:Amigo / QuickGO
Orthologs
Databases	NCBI: entry; OMA: entry
Species	Human	Mouse
Entrez	6935	21417
Ensembl	ENSG00000148516	ENSMUSG00000024238
UniProt	P37275	Q64318
RefSeq (mRNA)	NM_001128128; NM_001174093; NM_001174094; NM_001174095; NM_001174096 NM_030751; NM_001323638; NM_001323641; NM_001323642; NM_001323643; NM_001323644; NM_001323645; NM_001323646; NM_001323647; NM_001323648; NM_001323649; NM_001323650; NM_001323651; NM_001323652; NM_001323653; NM_001323654; NM_001323655; NM_001323656; NM_001323657; NM_001323658; NM_001323659; NM_001323660; NM_001323661; NM_001323662; NM_001323663; NM_001323664; NM_001323665; NM_001323666; NM_001323671; NM_001323672; NM_001323673; NM_001323674; NM_001323675; NM_001323676; NM_001323677; NM_001323678	NM_011546; NM_001360981; NM_001360982
RefSeq (protein)	NP_001121600; NP_001167564; NP_001167565; NP_001167566; NP_001167567 NP_001310567; NP_001310570; NP_001310571; NP_001310572; NP_001310573; NP_001310574; NP_001310575; NP_001310576; NP_001310577; NP_001310578; NP_001310579; NP_001310580; NP_001310581; NP_001310582; NP_001310583; NP_001310584; NP_001310585; NP_001310586; NP_001310587; NP_001310588; NP_001310589; NP_001310590; NP_001310591; NP_001310592; NP_001310593; NP_001310594; NP_001310595; NP_001310600; NP_001310601; NP_001310602; NP_001310603; NP_001310604; NP_001310605; NP_001310606; NP_001310607; NP_110378	NP_035676; NP_001347910; NP_001347911
Location (UCSC)	Chr 10: 31.32 – 31.53 Mb	Chr 18: 5.59 – 5.78 Mb
PubMed search
- Wikidata
View/Edit Human	View/Edit Mouse

Zinc finger E-box-binding homeobox 1 is a protein that in humans is encoded by the ZEB1 gene.

ZEB1 (previously known as TCF8) encodes a zinc finger and homeodomain transcription factor that represses T-lymphocyte-specific IL2 gene expression by binding to a negative regulatory domain 100 nucleotides 5-prime of the IL2 transcription start site. ZEB1 and its mammalian paralog ZEB2 belongs to the Zeb family within the ZF (zinc finger) class of homeodomain transcription factors. ZEB1 protein has seven zinc fingers and one homeodomain. The structure of the homeodomain is shown on the right.

== Clinical significance ==
Mutations of the gene are linked to posterior polymorphous corneal dystrophy 3. ZEB1 downregulates E-cadherin and induces epithelial to mesenchymal transition in breast and other carcinomas A recent study suggested its contributing role in lung cancer invasiveness and metastasis development. Overexpression of ZEB1 has been identified as a potential risk factor for recurrence and poor prognosis in several types of cancers.
