= ZEB2 =

Protein-coding gene in the species Homo sapiens

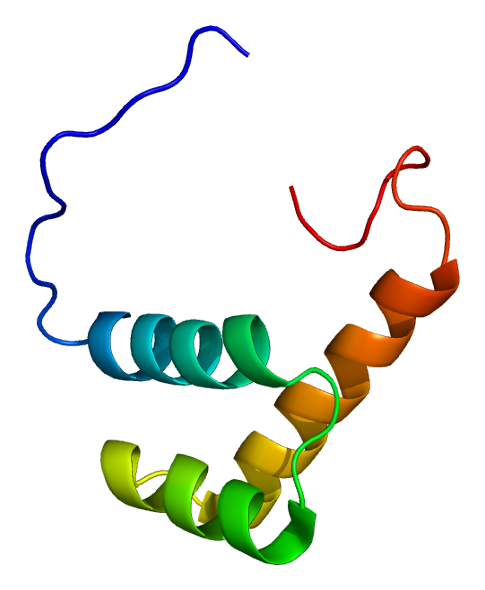

Identifiers
- Aliases: ZEB2, HSPC082, SIP-1, SIP1, SMADIP1, ZFHX1B, zinc finger E-box binding homeobox 2
- External IDs: OMIM: 605802; MGI: 1344407; GeneCards: ZEB2
Available structures
PDB	Ortholog search: PDBe RCSB
PDB	List of PDB id codes 2DA7

Gene location (Human)
Chr.	Chromosome 2 (human)
Band	2q22.3	Start	144,364,364 bp
Band	2q22.3	End	144,521,057 bp

Gene location (Mouse)
Chr.	Chromosome 2 (mouse)
Band	2|2 B	Start	44,873,644 bp
Band	2|2 B	End	45,007,407 bp
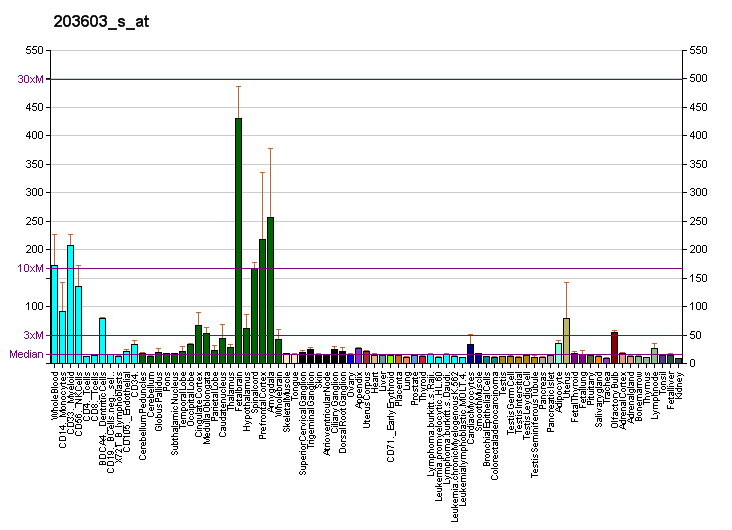
RNA expression pattern
Bgee	Human / Mouse (ortholog); Top expressed in: sural nerve; monocyte; C1 segment; Achilles tendon; corpus callosum; internal globus pallidus; inferior ganglion of vagus nerve; epithelium of colon; granulocyte; amygdala / Top expressed in: Rostral migratory stream; stroma of bone marrow; umbilical cord; human fetus; dentate gyrus; iris; dentate gyrus of hippocampal formation granule cell; subdivision of hippocampus; Region I of hippocampus proper; body of femur; More reference expression data
BioGPS	More reference expression data
Gene ontology
Molecular function	DNA binding; phosphatase regulator activity; metal ion binding; protein binding; nucleic acid binding; DNA-binding transcription repressor activity, RNA polymerase II-specific; DNA-binding transcription activator activity, RNA polymerase II-specific; R-SMAD binding; sequence-specific DNA binding; DNA-binding transcription factor activity, RNA polymerase II-specific
Cellular component	nucleus; nucleolus; cytosol
Biological process	regulation of transcription, DNA-templated; nervous system development; transcription, DNA-templated; positive regulation of melanin biosynthetic process; negative regulation of transcription by RNA polymerase II; neural crest cell migration; somitogenesis; neural tube closure; transcription by RNA polymerase II; central nervous system development; corpus callosum morphogenesis; hippocampus development; cell proliferation in forebrain; corticospinal tract morphogenesis; positive regulation of Wnt signaling pathway; positive regulation of JUN kinase activity; positive regulation of melanocyte differentiation; positive regulation of transcription by RNA polymerase II; developmental pigmentation; embryonic morphogenesis; collateral sprouting; positive regulation of axonogenesis; mammillary axonal complex development; melanocyte migration; positive regulation of lens fiber cell differentiation; regulation of melanosome organization
Sources:Amigo / QuickGO
Orthologs
Databases	NCBI: entry; OMA: entry
Species	Human	Mouse
Entrez	9839	24136
Ensembl	ENSG00000169554	ENSMUSG00000026872
UniProt	O60315	Q9R0G7
RefSeq (mRNA)	NM_001171653; NM_014795	NM_015753; NM_001289521; NM_001355288; NM_001355289; NM_001355290 NM_001355291
RefSeq (protein)	NP_001165124; NP_055610	NP_001276450; NP_056568; NP_001342217; NP_001342218; NP_001342219 NP_001342220
Location (UCSC)	Chr 2: 144.36 – 144.52 Mb	Chr 2: 44.87 – 45.01 Mb
PubMed search
- Wikidata
View/Edit Human	View/Edit Mouse

Zinc finger E-box-binding homeobox 2 is a protein that in humans is encoded by the ZEB2 gene. The ZEB2 protein is a transcription factor that plays a role in the transforming growth factor β (TGFβ) signaling pathways that are essential during early fetal development.

== Function ==
ZEB2 (previously also known as SMADIP1, SIP1) and its mammalian paralog ZEB1 belongs to the Zeb family within the ZF (zinc finger) class of homeodomain transcription factors. ZEB2 protein has 8 zinc fingers and 1 homeodomain. The structure of the homeodomain shown on the right.

ZEB2 interacts with receptor-mediated, activated full-length SMADs. The activation of TGFβ receptors brings about the phosphorylation of intracellular effector molecules, R-SMADs. ZEB2 is an R-SMAD-binding protein and acts as a transcriptional corepressor. It is involved in the timing of the conversion of neuroepithelial cells into radial glial cells in early development, a mechanism thought to allow for the large differences in brain size between humans and other mammals.

ZEB2 transcripts are found in tissues differentiated from the neural crest such as the cranial nerve ganglia, dorsal root ganglia, sympathetic ganglionic chains, the enteric nervous system and melanocytes. ZEB2 is also found in tissues that are not derived from the neural crest, including the wall of the digestive tract, kidneys, and skeletal muscles.

== Clinical significance ==
Mutations in the ZEB2 gene are associated with the Mowat–Wilson syndrome. This disease exhibits mutations and even complete deletions of the ZEB2 gene. Mutations of the gene can cause the gene to produce nonfunctional ZEB2 proteins or inactivate the function of the gene as a whole. These deficits of ZEB2 protein interfere with the development of many organs. Many of the symptoms can be explained by the irregular development of the structures from the neural crest.

Hirschsprung's disease also has many symptoms that can be explained by lack of ZEB2 during development of the digestive tract nerves. This disease causes severe constipation and enlargement of the colon.

The risk of hepatocellular carcinoma and cirrhosis in chronic hepatitis B has been reported to be associated with a single-nucleotide polymorphism in the promoter region of ZEB2, designated rs3806475, under a recessive model of inheritance.
