= Lauder family =

American Jewish family

- Current region: New York, New York State, U.S.
- Origin: United States · Hungary · Czechia · Slovakia
- Founder: William Lauter; Lillian Lauter; Joseph H. Lauder; Estée Lauder
- Members: Estée Lauder; Joseph H. Lauder; Leonard Lauder; William P. Lauder; Ronald Lauder; Offspring: Gary Lauder; Aerin Lauder; Jane Lauder; Rachel Lauder; Danielle Lauder; Jack Zinterhofer; Will Zinterhofer
- Connected members: Evelyn Lauder; Jo Carole Knopf; Karen Jacobs; Eric Zinterhofer; Kevin Warsh; Max Mentzer; Rose Schotz; Bertha Mentzer; Grace "Renee" Mentzer; Sylvan Schwartzreich; Helen Schwartzreich

The Lauder family is an American billionaire family. It owes its initial fame to Estée Lauder (1908–2004), who with her husband Joseph H. Lauder, made a fortune via her eponymous cosmetics business, The Estée Lauder Companies, during the 20th century.

The family is of Hungarian Jewish and Czech Jewish ancestry.

As of December 2022 the family net worth is estimated at $33 billion.

== Family tree ==
=== Lauder ===
Some of the family members include:
Please note capitalization of surnames is typically used in genealogy trees

- William LAUTER. Married to Lillian.
  - Joseph H. LAUDER (né LAUTER). Born: 26 Dec 1902. Married: 15 Jan 1930. Divorced: 11 Apr 1939. Remarried: 7 Dec 1942. Died: Jan 1983. Married to Josephine Esther "Estée" MENTZER. Born: 1 Jul 1908, Corona, Queens. Died: 24 Apr 2004.
    - Leonard A. LAUDER. Born: 19 Mar 1933. Died: 14 June 2025. Married: 1959. Married to Evelyn H. HAUSNER. Born: 12 Aug 1936, Vienna, Austria. Died: 12 Nov 2011, New York, New York. Married: 1 Jan 2015. Married to Judy GLICKMAN.
      - William P. LAUDER. Born: 11 Apr 1960. Married to Karen JACOBS.
        - Rachel LAUDER
        - Danielle LAUDER
        - Djuna-Bear LAUDER
    - Ronald S. LAUDER. Born: 26 Feb 1944, New York, New York. Married to Jo Carole KNOPF.
      - Aerin R. LAUDER. Born: 23 Apr 1970. Married: 1 Jun 1996. Married to Eric ZINTERHOFER.
        - Jack ZINTERHOFER
        - Will ZINTERHOFER
      - Jane LAUDER. Born 1973. Married to Kevin WARSH.

=== Mentzer ===
Some of the family members include:
Please note capitalization of surnames is typically used in genealogy trees

- Max MENTZER. Married to Rose SCHOTZ. (Born: abt 1837/1897. Married Abraham ROSENTHAL (first husband))
  - Sylvan Schwartzreich born 1908 (grandson of Rose, son of deceased Rose's daughter Bertha. Bertha, and unborn child, died in 1913. Sylvan raised by Rose due to death of mother, Bertha.
  - Helen Schwartzreich born 1910 (granddaughter of Rose, daughter of Rose's daughter Bertha. Helen raised by Rose due to death of mother, Bertha.
  - Grace "Renee" MENTZER.
  - Josephine Esther "Estée" MENTZER. Born: 1 JuL 1908, Corona, Queens. Married: 1930. Divorced: 11 Apr 1939. Remarried: 7 Dec 1942. Died: 24 Apr 2004. Married to Joseph H. LAUDER(né LAUTER).(Born: 26 Dec 1902. Died: Jan 1983.)

== Family members fortune ==
Members of the Lauder family on the Forbes World's Billionaires list of "the richest people in the world" in 2023:

Rank	Name	Net Worth
77	Leonard Lauder	$21 billion
534	Jane Lauder	$5 billion
591	Ronald Lauder	$4.6 billion
582	William Lauder	$3.4 billion
949	Aerin Lauder	$3.1 billion
2133	Gary Lauder	$1.3 billion
	Total	$38.4 billion
