= Zinterhofer =

Zinterhofer is a surname. Notable people with the surname include:

- Aerin Lauder Zinterhofer (born 1970), American billionaire heiress and businesswoman
- Eric Zinterhofer (born 1971), American private equity financier, husband of Aerin
