= Aerin =

Aerin is a given name. Notable people with the name include:

- Aerin Frankel (born 1999), American ice hockey goaltender
- Aerin Lauder (born 1970), American businesswoman

== See also ==
- Erin, given name
