= Brandon Truaxe =

Iranian-Canadian computer scientist (1978-2019)

- Born: Ali Roshan; 19 June 1978; Tehran, Iran
- Died: 20 January 2019 (aged 40); Toronto, Canada
- Education: University of Waterloo
- Occupation: Entrepreneur

Brandon Truaxe (born Ali Roshan; 19 June 1978 in Tehran – 20 January 2019 in Toronto), was an Iranian-Canadian computer scientist and cosmetics entrepreneur known as the founder of Toronto-based beauty company DECIEM.

== Early life ==
Truaxe was born Ali Roshan in Tehran on 19 June 1978 during a lull in the unrest that would explode in revolution a few weeks later. His family left Iran and went to Toronto in 1995 as refugees. His mother died of breast cancer when he was young and his estranged father returned to Iran. He studied computer science at the University of Waterloo, graduating in 2001. His formative professional experience happened around this time, when he had an internship on analysis software for "one of the big cosmetic manufacturers — a big brand that owns many things" in New York, and was shocked at the mark-ups it charged.

Shortly after graduation, Truaxe founded a software development firm, Schematte Corporation, and a nutritional supplements company, Organic Senses Ltd. The companies were dissolved in 2008 and 2007 for failure to file annual returns.

In 2003, Truaxe founded his first skincare brand, Euoko, with partner Julio Torres, supported by Pasquale Cusano, a Vancouver jeweller, who served as his mentor and investor. Truaxe resigned from the company in 2011.

In 2009 he founded another skincare brand, Indeed Labs. Truaxe left Indeed Labs in 2012 to found DECIEM, his fourth business.

== DECIEM ==
In 2012, Truaxe founded DECIEM The Abnormal Beauty Company, which functioned as an umbrella company. All DECIEM products are free of parabens, sulphates, mineral oil, methylchloroisothiazolinone, methylisothiazolinone, animal oils, coal tar dyes, formaldehyde, mercury and oxybenzone.

In April 2013, DECIEM debuted its first brand, Inhibitif, followed by The Chemistry Brand, Fountain and Grow Gorgeous. During the period of his non-compete clauses, he created the anti-aging hand cream for The Chemistry Brand. It was an instant bestseller when it launched, partly because people were also using it on their faces.

DECIEM's multi-brand strategy was driven by a vertically integrated structure: it had its own laboratory, in-house manufacturing, in-house e-commerce, in-store stores, and proprietary marketing infrastructure.

In August 2016, Truaxe co-launched DECIEM's The Ordinary product line, which focused on "cutting-edge" skincare products with moderate prices. The Ordinary was DECIEM's eleventh brand. It first sold exclusively online, then in various department stores, eventually opening about 30 company-owned stores in Canada, the US, the UK, Mexico, South Korea, and the Netherlands.

In June 2017, Truaxe's success attracted the attention of leading beauty conglomerate Estée Lauder Companies (ELC), which acquired an equity ownership of 28% (one-third equal partner) in DECIEM for $50 million. At the time, Truaxe released a statement praising ELC for embracing "our margins, our pricing strategy, our future plans (and) our disruptiveness". His decision was driven by the fact that the company simply could not keep up with the consumer demand for their products. In late 2018, DECIEM was in 42 stores worldwide and sold more than one product every second.

Truaxe received, among others awards, the Luxury Briefing Award (for ideas and excellence across the luxury industry) in the “Innovation in Beauty” category.

Under his leadership, annual revenue was headed to $300 million in sales, with plans to quickly quintuple in size in 2019.

== Controversy ==
In early 2018, Truaxe was accused of erratic behavior. Co-founder of DECIEM Nicola Kilner stated that "Before 2018, he barely even drank alcohol," responding to reports that he was ingesting psychedelic mushrooms in front of employees, convinced of their creative and spiritual benefits. According to an interview with the Financial Post, Truaxe took crystal meth in Britain, leading to an arrest and treatment.

In October 2018, ELC sought legal action after Truaxe ordered all of DECIEM's operations to close with immediate effect due to "financial crimes". He reached out on social media claiming attacks on his reputation via false information and fear for the safety of his family and himself. Truaxe was ousted as CEO, and Kilner was appointed as the sole CEO. A few days later, a restraining order was issued against Truaxe after he had sent emails to ELC chair emeritus Leonard Lauder and other executives. Andrew Ross, executive vice president of strategy and new business development at ELC, and Pasquale Cusano, the Vancouver jeweller, were now the company's only board members. ELC's injunction also led to the appointment of Pricewaterhouse Coopers to investigate, and report to the board, the alleged financial crimes.

== Death ==
Only a few months later, Truaxe died at age 40. His death took place early one morning, 20 January 2019, reportedly after falling from his Toronto apartment in the Distillery District.

A spokesperson for Estée Lauder Companies stated: "Brandon Truaxe was a true genius, and we are incredibly saddened by the news of his passing. As the visionary behind Deciem, he positively impacted millions of people around the world with his creativity, brilliance and innovation."
