= Origins (cosmetics) =

American cosmetics brand

Origins Natural Resources
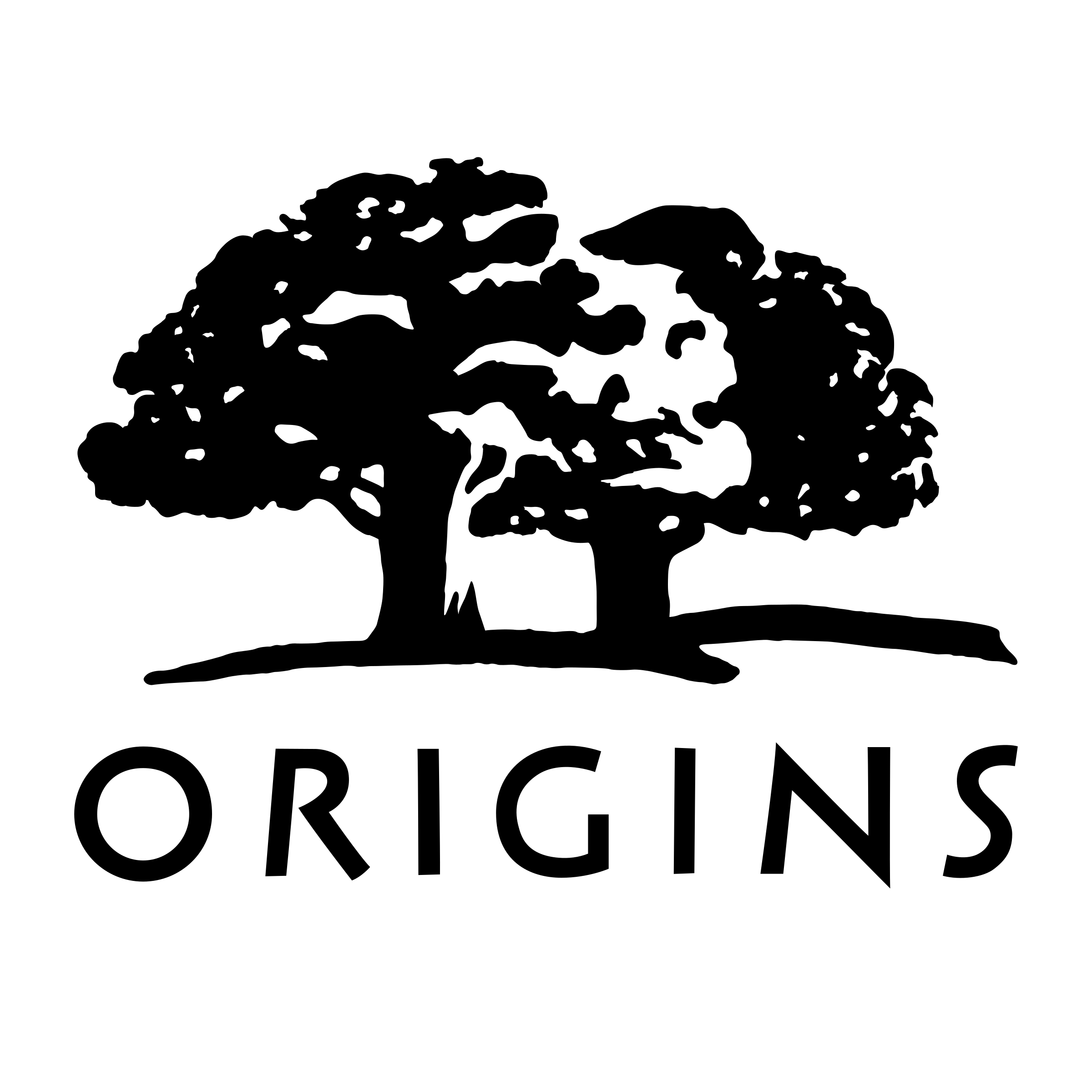
- Type: Division of holding company
- Industry: Cosmetics
- Founded: 1990
- Founder: Leonard Lauder
- Products: Skincare; hair care; makeup; fragrance
- Parent: Estée Lauder Companies (1990–present)
- Website: www.origins.com

Origins Natural Resources, Inc., trading as Origins, is an American cosmetics brand founded in 1990 by Leonard Lauder, son of Estée Lauder. It is one of the original brands of the Estée Lauder Companies.

== History ==
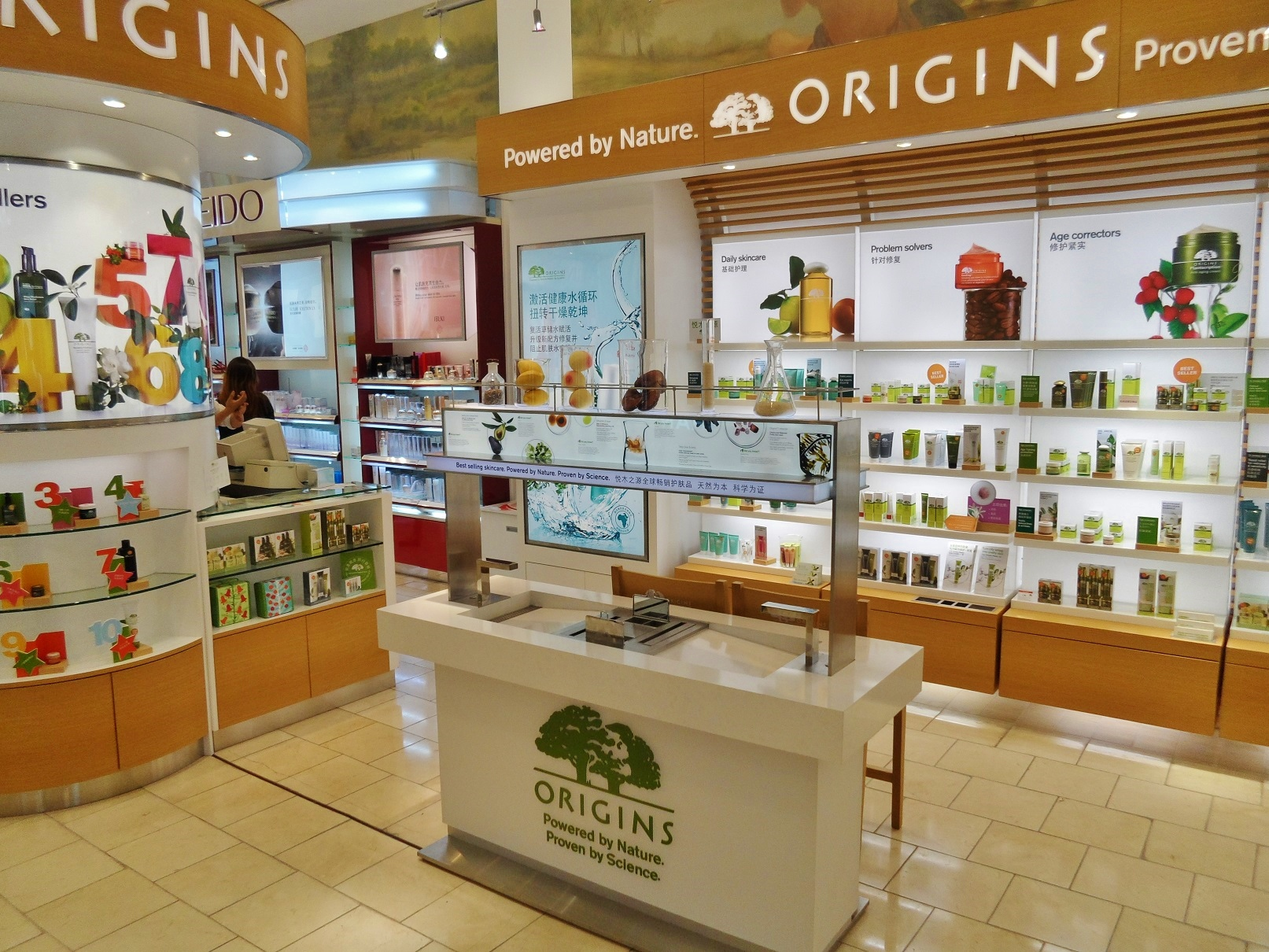
Origins at DFS Galleria Customhouse in Auckland, New Zealand.

The company is known for their natural skin care products. Notable lines include the "A Perfect World" line of products. Origins is also notable for its ongoing collaboration with Dr. Andrew Weil in his own line of products that target inflammation and sensitive skin.

After 25 years, the brand now has approximately 1,400 stores globally and plans to expand by opening around 90 stores in China.

On May 14, 2015, Origins launched an interactive photo and video app on iTunes called #QuarterLifeCrisis that consumers can use to take sticker-decorated selfies with.

== Products ==
In November 2007, Origins launched the first organic line of skin care products to carry a 95% organic USDA certification seal.

In February 2011, Origins launched Happy Birthday"Plantscription", an anti-aging serum which claims to rival the leading anti-wrinkle prescription retinoid creams with 0% irritation.

In June 2015, Origins launched a new skincare collection targeting the effects of global pollution called "Three Part Harmony." This is in line with its global Pollution Defense campaign.

The brand has also announced a new Original Skin collection later this year to target younger consumers' skin concerns with rough texture, enlarged pores, stressed skin, and loss of brightness.

== Operations and Finances ==
Origins' projections for 2015 include: continued strong top-line growth; increasing investment spending; constant currency net sales growth to be about 6%-7%; constant currency growth to be about 8%-10%; and emerging markets, excluding China, led by Turkey, Brazil, and South Africa to rise nearly 30%.

At the end of the 2014 fiscal year, Europe, the Middle East, and Africa represented 38% of net sales and 51% of operating income, and Asia and the Pacific region represented 20% of net sales and 19% of operating income.

=== Asia ===
==== China ====
Beginning July 1, 2015, Estée Lauder Companies is set to lower prices on many of its most popular products in China, affecting all skincare and makeup brands under the company and including Origins, Estée Lauder, Clinique, La Mer, MAC, Bobbi Brown, and Lab Series. The price reduction varies from 11% on the best-selling La Mer facial cream to 23% on an Origins fragrance.

==== Hong Kong ====
As of June 26, 2015, Origins recently opened its first greenhouse concept store in the IFC mall in Hong Kong to envelop its customers in an immersive and personalized space. The space showcases local material and artisanal work, including a locally sourced granite communal stone.

Stéphane de la Faverie, the Senior Vice President Global/General Manager of Origins, Ojon, and Darphin, says that this concept retail store "represents a major milestone for Origins since its establishment 25 years ago."

==== Philippines ====
Origins first launched in the Philippines in the early 2000s as the Sensory Therapy Peace of Mind product grew in popularity. A store-in-store is set to open in August 2015 at SM Makati after a 5-year absence in the country and region, except for Hong Kong.

== Environmental Commitment ==
By age 25, Origins has helped to plant over 600,000 trees.

In October 2020, Origins and its parent, the Estée Lauder Companies announced their partnership with global chemical industry leader SABIC and packaging manufacturer Albéa. Origins would be the first cosmetics brand to utilize advanced recycled resin in their tube packs produced by SABIC’s innovative recycling technology.

== Feedback ==
Olivia Tong, a research analyst and director of US cosmetics, household and personal care at Bank of America Merrill Lynch, surveyed 1,000 women between the ages of 18 and 29 using 160 brands to find out preferred cosmetics and beauty brands. When asked what other important factors were not mentioned in their purchasing decisions, many said naturals and organics; Burt's Bees and Origins were the two most cited.
