= Fabrizio Freda =

Italian business executive (born 1957)

- Born: August 31, 1957 (age 68); Naples, Italy
- Occupation: Chief executive officer (retired)
- Employer: Estee Lauder
- Board member of: BlackRock

Fabrizio Freda (born 31 August 1957) is an Italian business executive and the former chief executive officer of the Estée Lauder Companies.

== Early life ==
Freda was born on 31 August 1957 in Naples and graduated from the University of Naples Federico II in March 1981.

== Career ==
Freda was appointed president and chief executive officer of The Estée Lauder Companies Inc. on July 1, 2009, succeeding William P. Lauder. He had joined the company in March 2008, when he was appointed president and chief operating officer. He retired from Estee Lauder in 2024 and assumed the position of special advisor.

Freda was previously president of Procter & Gamble's Global Snacks division. Freda joined P&G in 1982 and spent 10 years in the health and beauty division.

He had a two-year stint at Gucci as international director of marketing and strategy until its sale to an investor group in 1988, before rejoining P&G.

In 2021, Freda's total compensation from Estée Lauder was $66 million, representing a CEO-to-median worker pay ratio of 1,965-to-1. In 2022, Freda's total calculated compensation as chief executive officer, president, and director at Estée Lauder was $25.5 million. In 2023, Freda's total compensation from Estée Lauder was $21.8 million, or 645 times the median employee pay at the Estée Lauder Companies for that year.

Freda is on the board of BlackRock.

== Awards and honors ==
In 2015, Freda received the Order of Merit for Labour from Italian President Sergio Mattarella.

== Personal life ==
Freda is married with a son and a daughter.
