= Emily Braun =

Art historian and curator

- Education: the Institute of Fine Arts, NYU
- Occupation(s): Distinguished professor of art history at The Graduate Center, CUNY and Hunter College
- Known for: History of Italian modernism and cubism

Emily Braun is a Canadian-born art historian, curator and distinguished professor of art history at Hunter College and the Graduate Center of the City University of New York. Braun is a specialist in the history of modern European art and is known for her contributions to the study of Italian modernism and cubism. In addition to her academic work, Braun has served as the curator of the Leonard A. Lauder Collection of Cubist Art.

== Biography ==
Braun received her Ph.D. in art history from The Institute of Fine Arts, NYU in 1991. Her academic work examines the interaction between political ideologies and visual representation in Europe, theories of viewer reception, the ideas of gender and otherness in art criticism, history of exhibitions and history of collecting, as well as the relationship between Cubism and popular culture. She has written on the work of European modern artists, including Gustav Klimt, Georges Braque, Pablo Picasso, and Alberto Burri among others. She is the author of Mario Sironi and Italian Modernism: Art and Politics under Fascism, published by Cambridge University Press in 2000, which The Journal of Modern History described as "a work that is as indispensable for cultural historians of twentieth-century Europe as it is for historians of the visual arts".

Emily Braun has also been active as a curator. Her exhibitions include Alberto Burri: The Trauma of Painting at the Solomon R. Guggenheim Museum, which was honored with the 2016 Dedalus Foundation Exhibition Catalogue Award, The Power of Conversation: Jewish Women and Their Salons (co-curator, 2005, The Jewish Museum, New York), which received a National Jewish Book Award, Gardens and Ghettos: The Art of Jewish Life in Italy (co-curator, 1989, The Jewish Museum, New York) and De Chirico and America (1996, Bertha and Karl Leubsdorf Gallery, Hunter College) which she organized with her graduate students at Hunter College.

== Leonard A. Lauder Collection of Cubist Art ==
Braun has served as the Curator of the Leonard A. Lauder Collection of Cubist Art since 1987. In 2014, she co-organized the exhibition of Lauder's holdings of Cubism at The Metropolitan Museum of Art in New York together with Rebecca Rabinow. Described by The New York Times as "one of the world's greatest collections of Cubist art", it includes 81 works by Pablo Picasso, Georges Braque, Fernand Léger, and Juan Gris. In 2013, Lauder promised the collection as a gift to the Met. Valued at over $1 billion, Lauder's contribution constitutes one of the largest gifts in the museum’s history.
