= Jane Lauder =

American businesswoman (born 1973)

- Born: July 1, 1973 (age 53)
- Education: Stanford University
- Occupation: Businesswoman
- Known for: Global President and General Manager of the Estée Lauder Companies
- Spouse: Kevin Warsh (m. 2002)
- Children: 2
- Father: Ronald Lauder
- Relatives: Lauder family

Jane Lauder (born July 1, 1973) is an American heiress and businesswoman.

== Career ==
Lauder joined the family business, Estée Lauder Companies, in 1996, a year after graduating from Stanford University.

In 2013, she was promoted to global president and general manager of Estée Lauder's Origins, Darphin, and Ojon brands. She also served as global brand director for Clinique until 2020, before becoming executive vice president and chief data officer, a role she served until December 2024.

She has been a member of Estée Lauder's board of directors since 2009 as well as the board of Eventbrite since 2018.

In 2025, Lauder launched TAW Ventures, a pet health investment firm. It acquired its first brand, Polkadog, in May 2026.

== Personal life ==
Lauder is the daughter of Jo Carole Lauder (née Knopf) and Ronald Lauder. Her father served as United States Ambassador to Austria under President Ronald Reagan and is also president of the World Jewish Congress. She is the granddaughter of Estée Lauder and Joseph Lauder, the co-founders of the cosmetics company Estée Lauder Companies. She has one sister, Aerin Lauder Zinterhofer.

Lauder graduated from the Chapin School and Stanford University.

She is married to Kevin Warsh, whom she met at Stanford University. Warsh is the Chair of the Federal Reserve and the youngest-ever appointee of the U.S. Federal Reserve System. The couple lives in Manhattan. They have two children and are known for keeping their family life private and shielding their children from the media spotlight.

Lauder has served on the board of trustees, and on various councils and committees, at the New York Public Library.

== See also ==
- Estée Lauder Companies
- Lauder family
