= Ronald Lauder =

American businessman (born 1944)

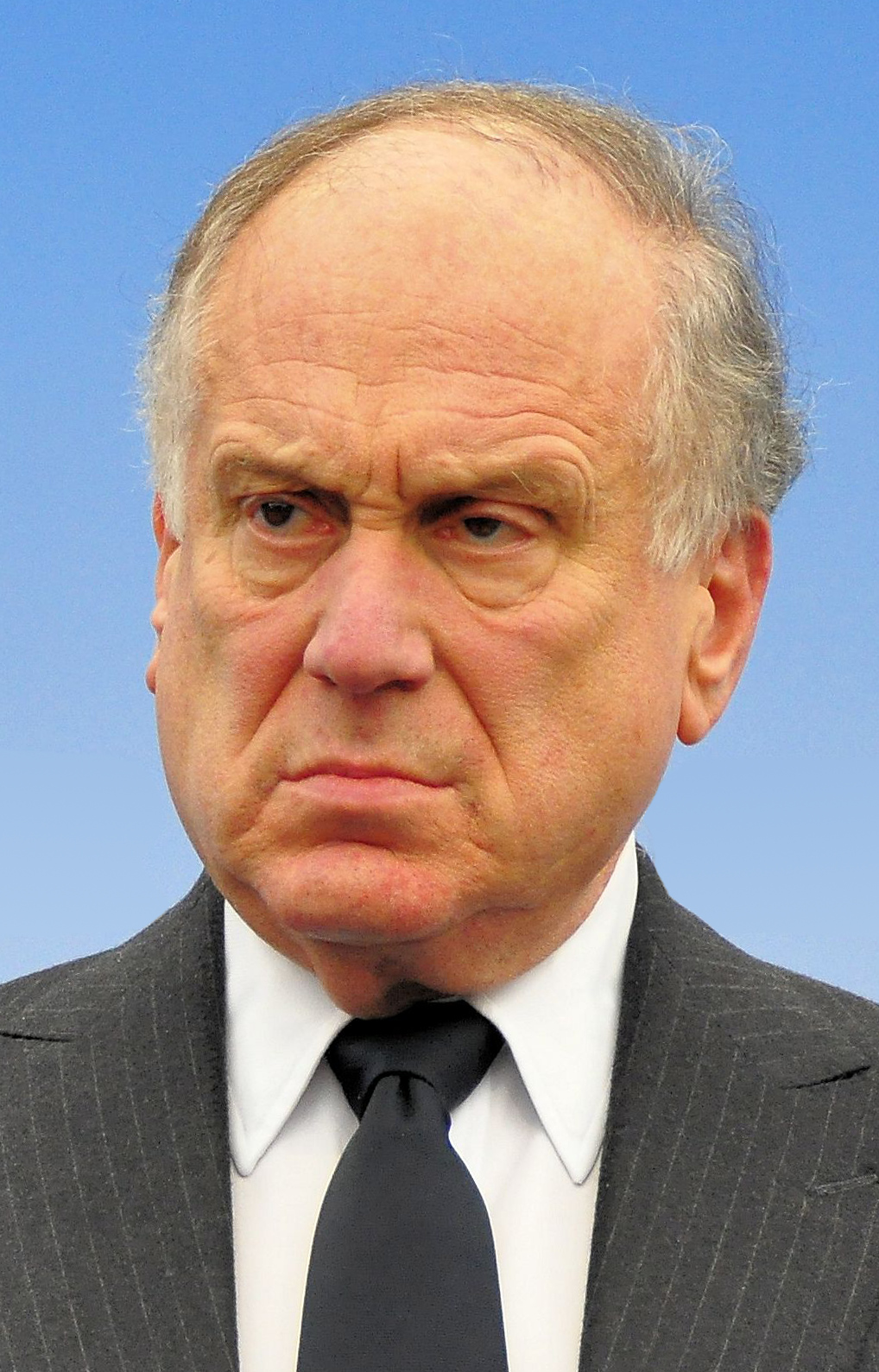
- Lauder in 2014

President of the World Jewish Congress
- Incumbent
- Assumed office June 10, 2007
- Preceded by: Edgar Bronfman, Sr.

United States Ambassador to Austria
- In office April 16, 1986 – October 27, 1987
- President: Ronald Reagan
- Preceded by: Helene A. von Damm
- Succeeded by: Henry Anatole Grunwald

Personal details
- Born: Ronald Steven Lauder; February 26, 1944 (age 82) New York City, U.S.
- Party: Republican
- Spouse: Jo Carole Knopf
- Children: Aerin Lauder Zinterhofer; Jane Lauder Warsh
- Parent: Estée Lauder (mother)
- Relatives: Leonard Lauder (brother); William P. Lauder (nephew); Eric Zinterhofer (son-in-law); Kevin Warsh (son-in-law)
- Education: University of Pennsylvania (BS); University of Paris; University of Brussels
- Occupation: Chairman Emeritus of Estée Lauder Companies

Ronald Steven Lauder (born February 26, 1944) is an American businessman. He is the sole heir to The Estée Lauder Companies, founded by his parents Estée Lauder and Joseph Lauder in 1946, following the death of his brother Leonard Lauder in 2025.

According to Forbes, Lauder had a net worth of $4.7 billion as of May 2025 (number 796 on Forbes' list of billionaires). Lauder is a longtime Republican Party donor, and supporter and longtime friend of President Donald Trump; he has been credited with planting the idea of annexing Greenland in Trump's mind.

Lauder ran in the Republican primary for mayor of New York City in 1989.

== Early life and education ==
Lauder was born in New York City to a Jewish family, the son of Estée Lauder and Joseph Lauder, founders of Estée Lauder Companies. He is the younger brother of Leonard Lauder, former chairman of the board of the Estée Lauder Companies.

He attended the Bronx High School of Science and holds a bachelor's degree in International Business from the Wharton School of Business at the University of Pennsylvania. He studied at the University of Paris and received a Certificate in International Business from the University of Brussels.

== Career ==
Lauder started to work for the Estée Lauder Company in 1964 as head of the international department. In 1984, he became a deputy assistant secretary of defense for European and NATO policy at the United States Department of Defense in the Ronald Reagan administration.

In 1986, Ronald Reagan named him as the United States ambassador to Austria, a position he held until 1987. As ambassador, he fired diplomatic officer Felix Bloch, who later became known in connection with the Robert Hanssen espionage case.

As a Republican, he made a bid to become the mayor of New York City in 1989, losing to Rudy Giuliani in the Republican primary (Giuliani lost to David Dinkins in the general election but defeated Dinkins in 1993). His campaign managers were Roger Ailes of Fox News and Arthur Finkelstein, a strong supporter of Richard Nixon. Michael Massing, writing of this nomination race, notes that politically Lauder 'seemed out of step with most American Jews; ... he ran to the right of Rudolph Giuliani. And, on Israeli issues, he was a vocal supporter of the Likud party, with long-standing ties to Benjamin Netanyahu." Lauder spent $14 million of his funds on the race. In 1994, he successfully led a campaign to place term limits on the mayor. In the Republican primary, Giuliani had 77,150 (67.0%) vote to 37,960 (33.0%) for Lauder.

In 1998, Lauder was asked by Israeli prime minister Benjamin Netanyahu to begin Track II negotiations with Syrian leader Hafez al-Assad; these negotiations continued after the election of Ehud Barak to the post. Lauder communicated a new-found willingness on Assad's part to make compromises with the Israelis in an overall land for peace deal, and his draft "Treaty of Peace Between Israel and Syria" formed an important part of the (ultimately fruitless) Israeli-Syrian negotiations that occurred in January 2000 in Shepherdstown, West Virginia.

Lauder manages investments in real estate and media, including Central European Media Enterprises and Israeli TV. In 2010, Lauder founded RWL Water, LLC.

Lauder suggested to Donald Trump that the United States purchase Greenland, which was discussed in the White House Situation Room as a trade involving Puerto Rico according to Elizabeth Neumann. Since Ronald Lauder acquired commercial holdings in Greenland, an article in the Guardian concluded in 2026 that Lauder's suggestions to the President may intersect with his own business interests.

== Philanthropic and political activities ==
Lauder has been involved with organizations, such as the Conference of Presidents of Major American Jewish Organizations, the Jewish National Fund, the World Jewish Congress, the American Jewish Joint Distribution Committee, the Anti-Defamation League, the Jewish Theological Seminary, Rabbinical College of America, Brandeis University, and the Abraham Fund. With his brother, he founded the Lauder Institute at the Wharton School. Lauder has also served as the finance chairman of the New York Republican State Committee. In 2003, Lauder founded and became the president of Lauder Business School in Vienna, Austria.

Lauder led a movement to introduce term limits in the New York City Council, which were subsequently imposed on most NYC elected officials, including the Mayor and City Council, after a citywide referendum in 1993. In 1996, voters turned down a council proposal to extend term limits. Lauder spent $4 million on the two referendums.

=== Art ===
On November 16, 2001, Lauder opened the Neue Galerie in New York, an art museum dedicated to art from Germany and Austria from the early 20th century. It holds one of the best collections of works by Egon Schiele in the world.

On June 18, 2006, he purchased from Maria Altmann and her family, the painting Portrait of Adele Bloch-Bauer I by Gustav Klimt for $135 million, the highest price ever paid for a painting at that time. Lauder called the painting "Our Mona Lisa". He reportedly saw Klimt's portrait as a youth in Vienna and had admired it since. The painting, a Nazi-looted art piece which had just been restored to Altmann following years of negotiation and litigation with the Austrian government, now forms the centerpiece of the museum's collection. Lauder was portrayed by Ben Miles in the film about the painting, Woman in Gold (2015).

Lauder also has the world's largest private collection of medieval and Renaissance armor.

Lauder has been criticized for failure to resolve a case involving the Museum of Modern Art (MoMA), which in 1997 exhibited some paintings owned by Rudolph Leopold, a Viennese doctor and art collector. An investigative article in The New York Times on December 24, 1997 – "A Singular Passion for Amassing Art, One Way or Another" – outlined a case involving Portrait of Wally by Egon Schiele, which was in the MoMA exhibition but was obtained by Leopold soon after the Nazi era. The New York County District Attorney (Manhattan) stepped in to help restore the piece to descendants of its original owner, but ownership of the painting is still in contention, nearly ten years later. Lauder has been accused of a failure to act on the case, despite being MoMA chairman at the time.

Lauder is an honorary trustee of the World Monuments Fund, a New York-based non-profit with the mission of protecting endangered cultural heritage sites around the world.

In 1987, Lauder established the Ronald S. Lauder Foundation, a philanthropic organization that is dedicated to rebuilding Jewish life in Central and Eastern Europe. The foundation also supports student exchange programs between New York and various capitals in Central and Eastern Europe.

In 1998, Lauder co-founded the Alzheimer's Drug Discovery Foundation with his brother, Leonard A. Lauder. Its mission it to "rapidly accelerate the discovery of drugs to prevent, treat and cure Alzheimer's disease." Ronald continues as the Foundation's co-chairman.

In 2014, Jeffrey Epstein established a limited liability company for Lauder and Leon Black to share ownership of a $25 million artwork by Kurt Schwitters.

In 2019, Lauder purchased a majority of the collection of The International Museum of World War II. An agreement to keep the museum open while a new home was found was terminated by Lauder.

In 2020, Lauder gave 91 pieces of arms and armor to the Metropolitan Museum of Art. The 91-object gift is the museum's most significant of arms and armor since 1942. To honor the gift, the museum's entire group of Arms and Armor galleries is now named for Lauder.

=== President of the World Jewish Congress ===
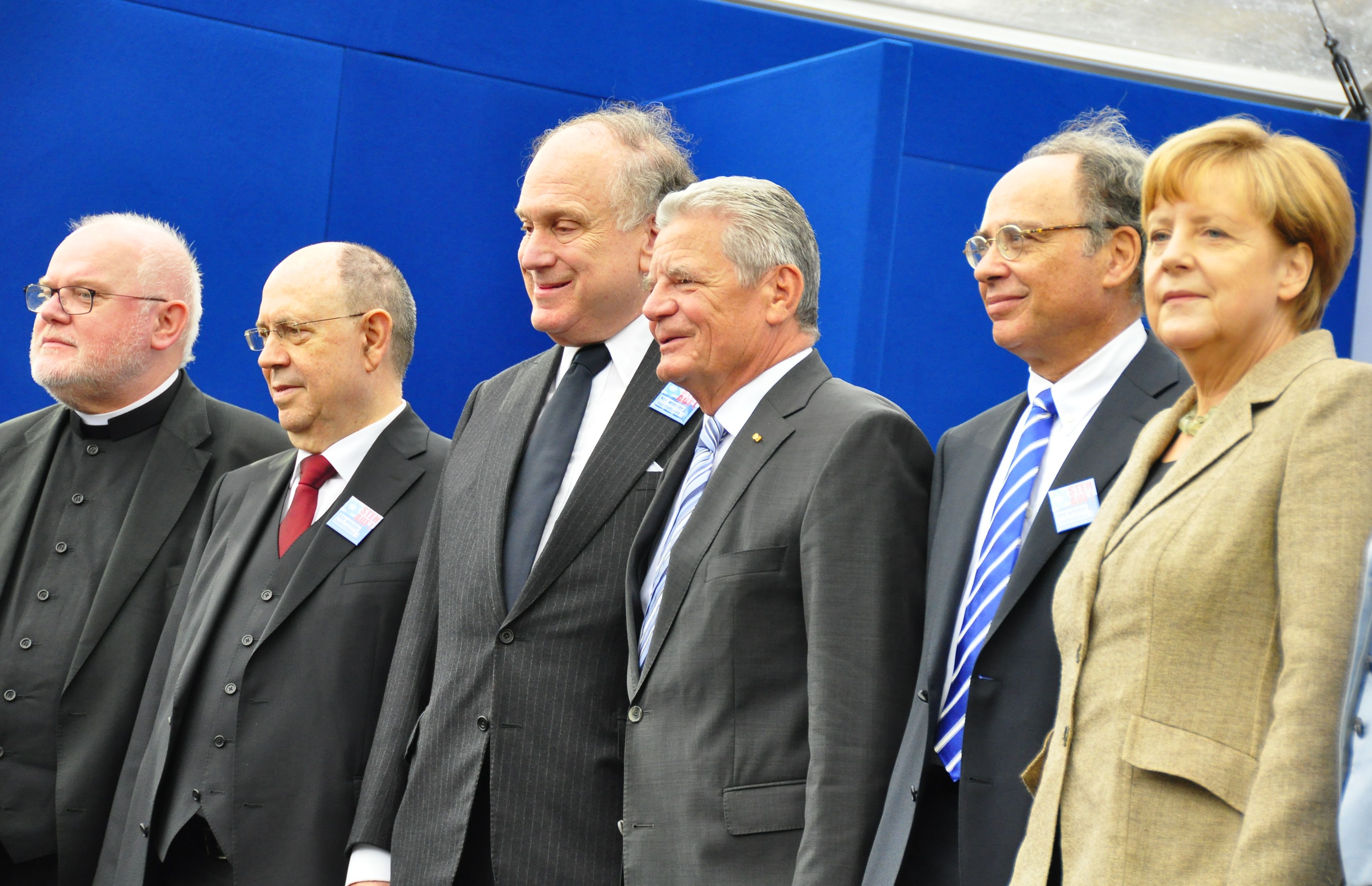
Lauder with German leaders at a rally against antisemitism in Berlin, September 14, 2014. Left to right: Cardinal Reinhard Marx, Protestant Church leader Nikolaus Schneider, Ronald S. Lauder, German Federal President Joachim Gauck, Central Council of Jews in Germany President Dieter Graumann, German Federal Chancellor Angela Merkel.

Lauder was elected president of the World Jewish Congress on June 10, 2007, following the resignation of Edgar Bronfman, Sr. He beat the South African businessman Mendel Kaplan and Einat Wilf of Israel by a clear margin.

President George W. Bush appointed him to serve on the honorary delegation to accompany him to Jerusalem for the celebration of the 60th anniversary of the State of Israel in May 2008.

Lauder condemned the persecution of Rohingya Muslims in Myanmar.

Lauder said in July 2025 that he believed the World Jewish Congress lawsuit against Swiss banks, which resulted in a $1.29 billion settlement in 1998, should be reopened because of allegations Credit Suisse, now owned by UBS, concealed documents that would have magnified the number of accounts held in Switzerland for Nazi interests and Holocaust victims. Lauder said he believed the original settlement should have been up to $10 billion higher.

=== Jewish activism ===
In July 2009, Bernie Ecclestone faced calls from Lauder to resign as Formula One chief after he had praised Adolf Hitler in a newspaper interview and said that Hitler "got things done". Lauder said someone with Ecclestone's views should not be allowed to run such an important and popular racing series. He urged Formula One teams, drivers, and host countries to suspend their cooperation with him. In reaction, Ecclestone told the news agency Associated Press that "I think the people who are saying that haven't got the power to say these things." Asked if the World Jewish Congress was influential, Ecclestone said: "It's a pity they didn't sort the banks out" and "They have a lot of influence everywhere". After a public outcry, Ecclestone apologized for his remarks and said he had "been an idiot".

In December 2009, Lauder protested against the Roman Curia's decree recognizing the heroic virtues of Pope Pius XII, asserting that an eventual beatification would be inopportune until the Holy See's historical archives from the 1939–1945 period were opened.

In 2011, writing in the German newspaper Die Welt, Lauder called for Israel to be admitted into the Western defense alliance NATO: "Israel needs real guarantees for its security. European NATO member states – including Turkey – must admit the state of Israel into the Western alliance," the WJC president wrote. He referred to the uprisings in Egypt and Tunisia and said they were reminders of how "unpredictable" developments in the Middle East were. Israeli NATO membership "would send a strong signal to other countries not to take on Israel", Lauder argued.

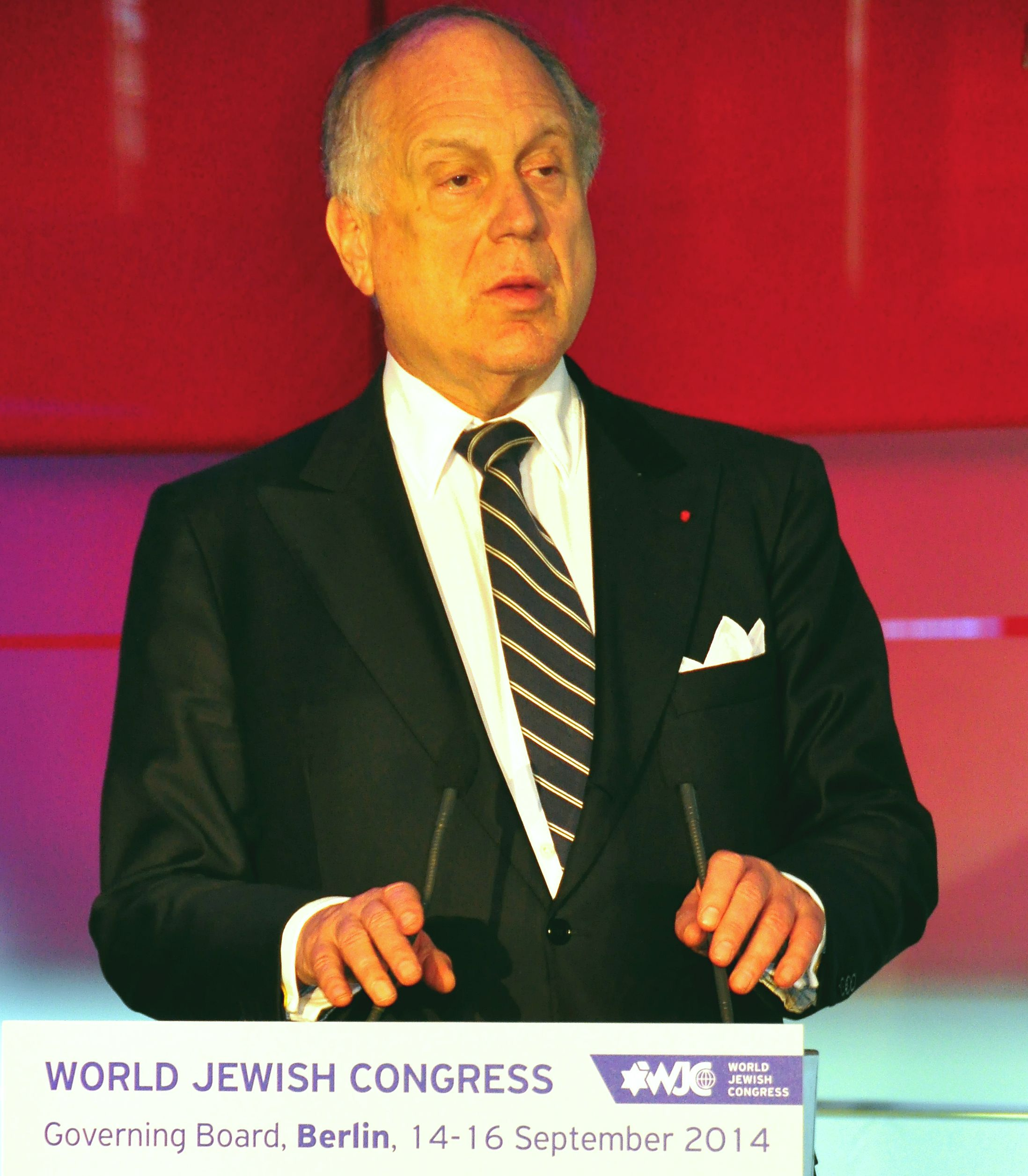
Lauder addressing a World Jewish Congress meeting in Berlin

Lauder has also been outspoken on antisemitism. In an opinion article entitled "Sweden's Shame", he attacked the Swedish government, church officials, and media for "fanning the flames" of hatred against Jews.

In May 2012, Lauder condemned as "despicable" remarks made by the Norwegian sociologist Johan Galtung who had "revived anti-Semitic canards such as Jewish control of the media" and suggested that Israel's Mossad could have been behind the 2011 "massacres in Norway committed by Anders Breivik" in which 77 people died. Lauder declared: "There is a growing tendency to blame the Jews for all evil that happens under the sun. It is a scandal that a leading academic such as Galtung does not shy away from citing notorious forgeries such as the Protocols of the Elders of Zion to support his bigoted arguments."

In August 2012, Lauder criticized Austrian politicians for failing to publicly denounce the leader of the third-largest political party in the country, the FPÖ, Heinz-Christian Strache, who had posted an anti-Semitic cartoon on his Facebook page. "Clearly, and not for the first time, the FPÖ leader is trying to whip up anti-Semitic sentiment. His repeated denials are not credible because his words and actions speak for themselves," Ronald Lauder said in a statement, adding: "This scandal shows that anti-Jewish resentment is still widespread, and unscrupulous politicians are allowed to exploit it for electioneering purposes. That is mind-boggling, and it could have negative repercussions for Austrian Jews." The Israelitische Kultusgemeinde Wien (Vienna Israelite Community) banned Lauder for allegedly interfering in its board elections. IKG President Oskar Deutsch alleged that Lauder had offered incentives to members of the IKG to support another candidate. A Lauder spokesman denied the allegations. In January 2013, it was reported that Deutsch and Lauder had resolved their dispute.

Lauder has been strongly critical of business deals by European energy firms with Iran and called for stronger UN sanctions because of Tehran's threat against Israel and its nuclear program. In April 2008, he criticized a visit by Swiss Foreign Minister Micheline Calmy-Rey to Tehran where she met with Iran's President Mahmoud Ahmadinejad to help a Swiss company secure a multibillion-dollar contract to buy natural gas from Iran. Lauder told a press conference in Bern: "Maybe that money that Switzerland is paying to Iran will some day be used to either buy weapons to kill Israelis, or buy weapons to kill Americans, or buy missiles to be able to deliver nuclear weapons." Lauder also led diplomatic efforts to persuade European businesses to withdraw from Iran. In January 2010, he warmly welcomed the announcement by Siemens CEO Peter Löscher that his company would not seek new business in Iran.

In February 2018, the Polish Prime Minister Mateusz Morawiecki stated that "there were Jewish perpetrators" of the Holocaust, "not only German perpetrators." Lauder condemned Morawiecki's comment as antisemitic, saying: "The Polish prime minister [Morawiecki] has displayed appalling ignorance with his unconscionable claim that so-called 'Jewish perpetrators' were partly responsible for the Nazi German attempt to wipe out European Jewry ... this government is going to extreme and unfathomable lengths to exonerate some of their countrymen's own complicity in the murders of their neighbors. This is nothing short of an attempt to falsify history, which is one of the very worst forms of anti-Semitism and Holocaust obfuscation. We demand an immediate retraction and apology from the Polish government for these absurd and offensive remarks."

The Washington Examiner reported in October 2023 that Lauder announced he was no longer providing financial resources to the University of Pennsylvania over antisemitism concerns following the October 7 attacks by Hamas on Israel.

=== Conservative activism and donations ===
Lauder had donated $1.1 million in 2016 to Secure America Now (SAN). In the same year, SAN broadcast anti-Muslim social media videos in swing states just before the U.S. elections. Lauder disavowed the videos; a spokesman said that he had donated to the group "support their work in opposition to the Iran nuclear deal" (which had concluded in 2015) and "had nothing to do with any of the group's other activities"; the spokesman said that Lauder supported "interfaith respect and dialogue" and "would never be involved with insulting people of faith." The videos at issue may have been targeted at increasing turnout among supporters of Donald Trump.

Lauder is a longtime Republican Party donor. Since 2016, Lauder has donated more than $1.6 million to pro-Donald Trump organizations. He contributed $200,000 to Donald Trump's 2020 presidential campaign. He attended the 2025 Trump inauguration.

Lauder pitched the idea to Trump to buy Greenland from Denmark in 2019. In the proposal, he offered to be the intermediary for the transaction, which Denmark rejected. His involvement was first reported in a 2022 book The Divider by Peter Baker and his wife Susan Glasser.

In 2020, Lauder donated $1.7 million to a new independent expenditure group that opposed criminal justice reform in New York.

In 2023, Lauder donated $8,000 to the Nikki Haley 2024 presidential campaign.

His brother supported Kathy Hochul's successful campaign for New York governor in 2022, but Ronald himself gave $11 million to the Republican challenger Lee Zeldin.

In 2025, Lauder donated $5 million to the MAGA Inc. super PAC.

== Israel activism ==
Lauder has repeatedly come to the defense of Israel and was for many years a close ally and confidant of Israeli Prime Minister Benjamin Netanyahu. Their relationship dated to Netanyahu's tenure as Israel's ambassador to the United Nations in the 1980s. Lauder helped introduce Netanyahu to Republican political strategist Arthur Finkelstein, who subsequently worked on Netanyahu's election campaigns.

In the late 1990s, Lauder served as an intermediary in secret negotiations between Israel and Syria at Netanyahu's request. In an October 2026 interview with Haaretz, Lauder said that he had spent approximately 10 to 15 months traveling between Israel, Syria and Lebanon to negotiate a peace agreement with Syrian President Hafez al-Assad, with the involvement of Lebanese Prime Minister Rafic Hariri. According to Lauder, the negotiations produced a ten-point agreement under which Israel would withdraw from the Golan Heights in exchange for peace with Syria. Lauder claimed that both Netanyahu and Assad had accepted the terms, but that Netanyahu subsequently refused to sign unless Defense Minister Ariel Sharon endorsed the agreement. Netanyahu has denied agreeing to relinquish the Golan Heights. Lauder said that Netanyahu's decision to abandon the agreement had permanently damaged their relationship.

In remarks to the International Council of Jewish Parliamentarians made on June 28, 2011, Lauder reportedly criticized Netanyahu for several missteps, including lacking a diplomatic plan ahead of a United Nations vote on Palestinian statehood and setting preconditions for Israeli-Palestinian peace negotiations.

In May 2012, Lauder criticized a proposal by Ireland's Deputy Prime Minister and Foreign Minister Eamon Gilmore for a European Union-wide ban on imports from Israeli settlements in the West Bank. Lauder described the proposed boycott as "cynical and hypocritical" and argued that the territories were legally disputed rather than illegally occupied.

In June 2012, on the third anniversary of Netanyahu's Bar-Ilan speech, Lauder published a full-page advertisement in The Wall Street Journal and other newspapers calling on Palestinian President Mahmoud Abbas to resume negotiations with Israel.

In October 2026, ahead of the 2026 Israeli legislative election, Lauder publicly opposed Netanyahu's reelection. In an interview with Haaretz, he described Netanyahu as "a dictator — a one-person show" and warned that Israel's democratic institutions and international standing were deteriorating under his leadership. He also criticized National Security Minister Itamar Ben-Gvir and Finance Minister Bezalel Smotrich, arguing that their participation in government was damaging Israel's reputation. Lauder said that, although he did not intend to vote, he would support Gadi Eisenkot if required to choose a candidate.

Lauder also expressed concern that Israel was losing support among American Democrats, Republicans and Diaspora Jews. He said that he had sold or donated his properties in Israel and did not intend to return to the country. Despite his criticism of Netanyahu and the Israeli government, Lauder reaffirmed his support for Zionism and his commitment to Israel's future.

== Channel 10 ==
Lauder has participated in a number of large media deals in Israel, among which was his purchase of part of commercial television Channel 10.

In September 2011, Israeli media published accounts that Lauder had put heavy pressure on the executives of the channel to broadcast a personal apology to the businessman Sheldon Adelson with regard to a profile that the channel had broadcast in January 2011. The apology read, "After the broadcast of the piece, we checked the accusations. Our checks revealed that the accusations were – and are – completely false ... We are very regretful that we did not check these accusations before broadcasting them." Lauder's forcing of the form of the apology led to the resignation of the channel's news chief Reudor Benziman, its news editor, Ruti Yuval, and its presenter, Guy Zohar (who continues in another post in Channel 10), who criticized Lauder for the pressure he exerted. Because of the attacks, detailed above, on Lauder (who had been until then the last major funder of the channel), he decided to reconsider his financial support. If the channel lost its funding, it would have difficulty continuing to operate to its current standard past October 2011.

On November 3, 2011, The Second Authority for Television and Radio decided on the issue in which it decided that the apology to Adelson broadcast by the channel was appropriate and that "no evidence has been presented that there was any intervention by the shareholders of Channel 10 on new content, or even on the text of the apology, which was agreed between the news company and the person injured by the broadcast."

In an October 2026 interview with Haaretz, Lauder said that his involvement with Channel 10 had contributed to the breakdown of his relationship with Netanyahu. According to former advisers interviewed by the newspaper, Netanyahu had initially encouraged Lauder to invest in the television station but subsequently complained about its critical coverage of his government. Asked about the effect of Channel 10 on their relationship, Lauder said, "It destroyed it."

== Relationship with Jeffrey Epstein ==
DOJ files released in 2026 showed that Ronald Lauder kept contact with Jeffrey Epstein years after his 2008 sex offender conviction, the emails mention personal meetings and business relationship between both parties.

== Personal life ==
Lauder is married to Jo Carole (Knopf) Lauder. They have two children, Aerin and Jane, and many grandchildren.

Lauder's daughter Jane is married to Kevin Warsh, Chairman of the Federal Reserve Board of Governors

In 1985, he published a book titled Fighting Violent Crime in America.

A 2007 profile of Lauder in The New Yorker magazine detailed his residences, including three properties in Manhattan – a townhouse on East 70th Street, the Rockefeller Guest House on East 52nd Street, as well as an apartment at 740 Park Avenue. The profile additionally listed homes in Florida, London, Paris, and Wainscott, Long Island. He sold the Rockefeller Guest House in December 2023.

== Honors ==
- 2011: Andrew Carnegie Medal of Philanthropy
- 2018: Andrey Sheptytsky Medal
- 2018: Harvey Prize awarded in 2019

== See also ==
- CME/Lauder v. Czech Republic
- Lauder – Morasha School

Party political offices
Preceded by Diane McGrath	Conservative Nominee for Mayor of New York City; 1989	Succeeded by George Marlin
Diplomatic posts
Preceded by Helene A. von Damm	U.S. Ambassador to Austria; 1986–1987	Succeeded by Henry Anatole Grunwald
