= Bumble and bumble =

Brands owned by Estée Lauder Companies

Bumble and bumble Products, LLC
- Type: Private
- Industry: Cosmetics
- Founded: 1977
- Products: Hair care
- Parent: Estée Lauder Companies
- Website: www.bumbleandbumble.com

Bumble and bumble Products, LLC, known more commonly as Bumble and Bumble is a hair salon and product company established in 1977 by hairdresser and entrepreneur Michael Gordon.

The company operates one flagship salon location in New York City.

Bumble and Bumble is one of 27 brands owned by Estée Lauder Companies, Inc.
