= Evelyn Lauder =

Jewish American businesswoman and philanthropist

- Born: Evelyn Hausner; August 12, 1936; Vienna, Austria
- Died: November 12, 2011 (aged 75); New York City, US
- Spouse: Leonard Lauder (m. 1959)
- Children: William P. Lauder; Gary Lauder
- Website: EvelynLauder.com

Evelyn Lauder (née Hausner; August 12, 1936 – November 12, 2011) was an Austrian businesswoman, socialite and philanthropist.

She married Leonard Lauder, the son of Estee and Joseph Lauder, who co-founded the Estée Lauder cosmetics company. Evelyn joined the company and became senior corporate vice president and head of fragrance development. She created the Clinique brand and developed its line of products.

Lauder was one of the creators and popularizers of the pink ribbon as a symbol for awareness of breast cancer.

== Early life ==
She was born Evelyn Hausner in 1936 in Vienna, Austria, to a Jewish family. Lauder's family fled Nazi-occupied Austria in 1938, using their household silver to get visas to Belgium. They then moved on to England where her mother was sent to an internment camp on the Isle of Man and Evelyn was placed in a nursery. The family arrived in New York City in 1940.

She graduated from Hunter College High School in 1954. She then attended Hunter College, part of the City University of New York, where she studied Psychology and Anthropology and also where she met her future husband, Leonard Lauder, then a trainee naval officer, on a blind date. She graduated from Hunter College in 1958. The couple were married on July 5, 1959. After the marriage, she worked for several years as a public school teacher in Harlem before leaving to work with her husband at the company founded in 1946 by her mother-in-law, Estée Lauder, which at the time sold six products: a red lipstick, creams, lotions, and Youth-Dew fragrance in a bath oil.

== Career ==
Lauder was the senior corporate vice president of the Estée Lauder Companies and a member of the board of overseers at the Memorial Sloan-Kettering Cancer Center. A 1995 profile in The New York Times called her "an immaculately turned-out, awesomely organized woman" who had started to fill the public role that had been filled by her mother-in-law, Estée Lauder.

Lauder created the Clinique brand and developed its product line. She worked as the training director for Clinique and was the first person to wear the trademark white lab coat, now worn by Clinique salespeople at cosmetic departments worldwide.

== Breast cancer activism ==
Lauder personally raised much of the $13.6 million that went to create the Evelyn H. Lauder Breast Center at Memorial Sloan-Kettering Cancer Center, which opened in October 1992 and focuses on the treatment and diagnosis of breast cancer. She helped raise an additional $5 million to create an endowment to be used to fund clinical research there.

Self magazine's first annual issue for National Breast Cancer Awareness Month came after an April 1991 lunch at the 21 Club, at which Lauder discussed ideas for articles about breast cancer with her friend Alexandra Penney, who was then editor of Self.

Together with Penney, Lauder established The Breast Cancer Research Foundation and formalized the pink ribbon as a symbol for breast cancer awareness as part of Self magazine's second annual Breast Cancer Awareness Month issue in 1992. Penney's inspiration to improve on the success of the magazine's first annual issue was to create a ribbon that would be placed in Estee Lauder's New York City stores. Lauder made the commitment to have the ribbons placed on the company's cosmetics counters across the United States.

By 1993, Lauder had overseen the creation of a new shade called Pink Ribbon that was part of her personal and corporate effort to raise breast cancer awareness. Her husband paid the cost of registering the Breast Cancer Research Foundation in all 50 states. By the start of 1995, some $900,000 had been raised for the foundation, including $120,000 from the sale of Pink Ribbon lipstick and blusher, and $190,000 from the sale of the Clinique Berry Kiss pink lipstick.

By October 2008, the Estée Lauder Companies estimated that the firm's Breast Cancer Awareness Campaign had raised $335 million towards research and distributed 80 million pink ribbons.

Following Lauder's death, Delta Air Lines, which had already dedicated one of its Boeing 767-400ER long-haul planes in honor of the Breast Cancer Research Foundation that Lauder founded and painted it in a pink livery while Lauder was living, re-christened and renamed the same plane in her memory.

== Personal life ==
She was married to Leonard Lauder, former chairman of the Estée Lauder Companies, from 1959 until her death. They had two sons: William P. Lauder and Gary M. Lauder, managing director of Lauder Partners LLC.

== Death ==
Evelyn Lauder died at home in Manhattan from complications of nongenetic ovarian cancer. She was a longtime resident of Palm Beach, Florida. A private funeral service was held at the Central Synagogue in New York City.

== Awards and recognition ==
- 2010: CSHL Double Helix Medal honoree
