= Kevin Warsh =

Chairman of the Federal Reserve since 2026

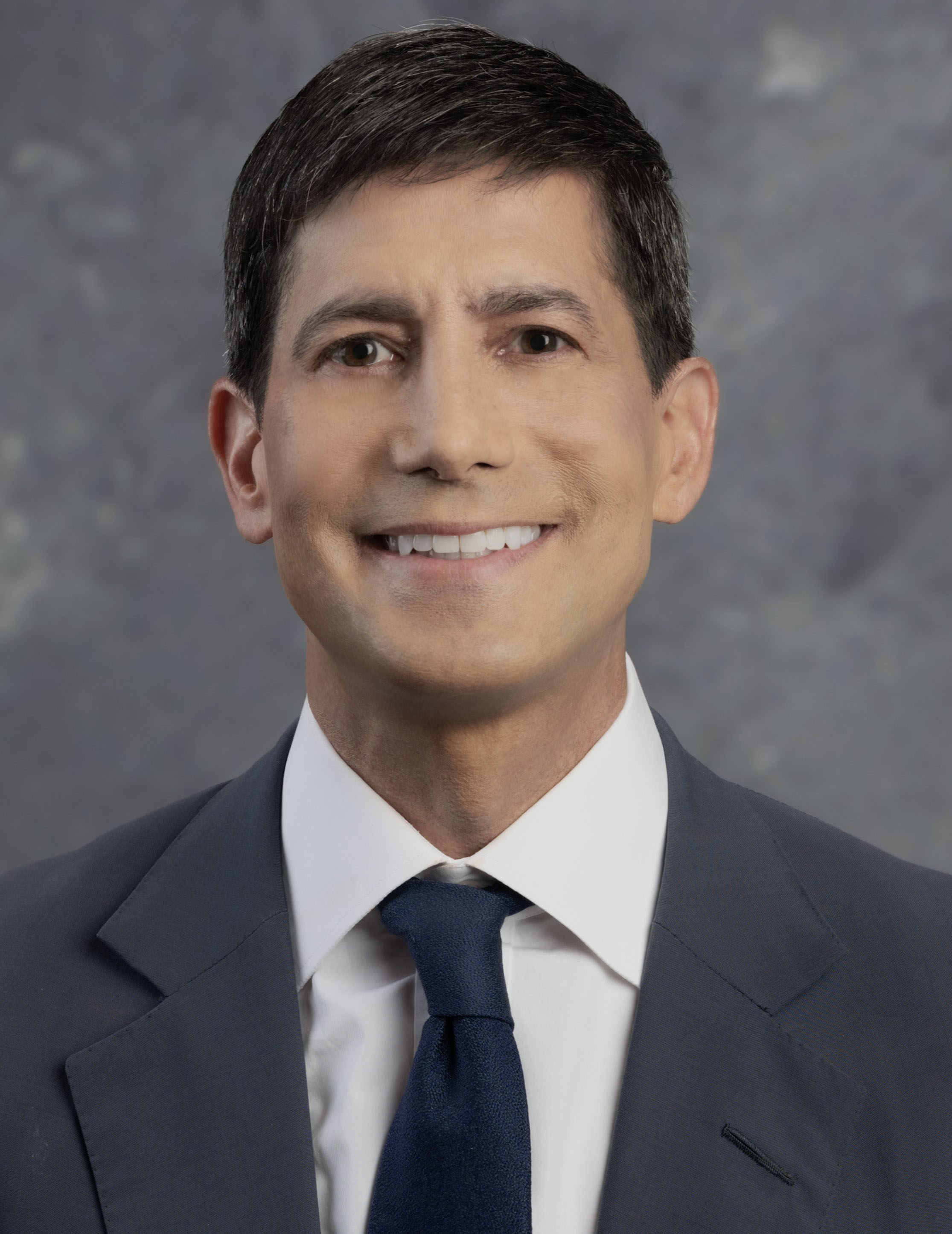
- Official portrait, 2026

17th Chair of the Federal Reserve
- Incumbent
- Assumed office May 22, 2026
- President: Donald Trump
- Preceded by: Jerome Powell

Member of the Federal Reserve Board of Governors
- Incumbent
- Assumed office May 22, 2026
- President: Donald Trump
- Preceded by: Stephen Miran
- In office February 24, 2006 – March 31, 2011
- President: George W. Bush; Barack Obama
- Preceded by: Ben Bernanke
- Succeeded by: Jeremy C. Stein

Personal details
- Born: Kevin Maxwell Warsh; April 13, 1970 (age 56) Albany, New York, U.S.
- Party: Republican
- Spouse: Jane Lauder (m. 2002)
- Children: 2
- Relatives: Lauder family
- Education: Stanford University (BA); Harvard University (JD)

Kevin Maxwell Warsh (born April 13, 1970) is an American financier and attorney who has served as the 17th chair of the Federal Reserve and a member of the Federal Reserve Board of Governors since 2026. Warsh previously served as a member of the Federal Reserve Board of Governors from 2006 to 2011.

Warsh graduated from Stanford University with a bachelor's degree in public policy in 1992 and from Harvard Law School with a Juris Doctor in 1995. He worked for Morgan Stanley from 1995 to 2002, specializing in mergers and acquisitions. In 2002, President George W. Bush named Warsh as a special assistant to the president for economic policy and the executive secretary of the National Economic Council. Warsh's work involved handling the aftermath of multiple significant accounting scandals, including representing the Bush administration in discussions over the Sarbanes–Oxley Act.

Bush nominated Warsh to serve on the Federal Reserve Board of Governors in 2006. He served as a lieutenant to the board's chairman, Ben Bernanke, particularly in responding to the 2008 financial crisis. As the Federal Reserve's central liaison to financial markets, Warsh was involved in the sale of Bear Stearns to JPMorgan Chase, the bankruptcy of Lehman Brothers, and the bailout of American International Group. After opposing a plan to purchase US$600 billion in Treasury securities, a move favored by Bernanke, Warsh resigned in 2011. After his resignation, he was a lecturer at the Stanford Graduate School of Business until 2026.

In January 2026, President Donald Trump named Warsh as his nominee to serve as the chair of the Federal Reserve, succeeding Jerome Powell. His nomination was delayed over a federal investigation into Powell. The Senate voted to confirm Warsh as a member of the Federal Reserve Board of Governors and as the chair of the Federal Reserve the following month. The vote to confirm Warsh as chair was the narrowest for the position in U.S. history.

== Early life and education ==
Kevin Maxwell Warsh was born on April 13, 1970, in Albany, New York. He is Jewish. He was the youngest of three children of Robert and Judith Warsh. Robert was a manufacturer of school uniforms who was raised in Loudonville. He graduated from Shaker High School, where he played on the school's varsity tennis team. In his youth, Warsh appeared in local television commercials and in the film Ironweed (1987).

Warsh's interest in tennis led him to attend Stanford University, where he served as the chair of the Senate of Associated Students. A member of the Hoover Institution, he helped its economists build computer models. Warsh graduated from Stanford with a bachelor's degree in public policy in 1992. He considered remaining at Stanford to pursue a doctorate in economics, but at his father's insistence, he attended Harvard Law School, graduating cum laude with a Juris Doctor in 1995. Warsh completed coursework in market economics and debt capital markets at Harvard University and the Massachusetts Institute of Technology. He was a summer associate at Cravath, Swaine & Moore and Brobeck, Phleger & Harrison.

== Career ==
=== 1996–2002: Morgan Stanley ===
In August 1996, Morgan Stanley hired Warsh as an associate. He worked on mergers and acquisitions at the firm. Warsh was later promoted to the vice president and the executive director of investment banking within Morgan Stanley's mergers and acquisitions division. Warsh worked in Morgan Stanley's headquarters on the morning of the September 11 attacks and claimed to witness the collapse of the World Trade Center. The experience motivated him to leave Morgan Stanley and pursue a government career.

=== 2002-2006: National Economic Council ===
In April 2002, President George W. Bush named Warsh as a special assistant to the president for economic policy and the executive secretary of the National Economic Council. In the former position, he managed domestic finance, capital markets, and banking issues. Warsh was particularly involved in handling the Bush administration's response to various accounting scandals that emerged in Bush's term, including negotiations over the Sarbanes–Oxley Act. His work additionally involved public relations. Warsh served as the White House liaison to the Federal Deposit Insurance Corporation, the Commodity Futures Trading Commission, and the Securities and Exchange Commission. That month, Warsh married Jane Lauder, an heiress to the Estée Lauder Companies, whom he had met at Stanford University. Warsh was a possible candidate to serve as the chair of the Securities and Exchange Commission to succeed William H. Donaldson and as the under secretary of the treasury for domestic finance to succeed Brian C. Roseboro. He helped Ben Bernanke prepare for his confirmation hearing to serve on the Federal Reserve Board of Governors.

=== 2006–2011: Federal Reserve Board of Governors ===
==== Nomination and confirmation ====
In July 2005, Bloomberg News reported that the Bush administration was examining appointing Warsh to a vacancy on the Federal Reserve Board of Governors; he had previously been discussed as a possible candidate to serve as the chair of the Securities and Exchange Commission before President George W. Bush nominated Christopher Cox. The administration sought to complement chairman Ben Bernanke's experience with Warsh's expertise on financial regulations. On January 27, 2006, President George W. Bush named Warsh and the economist Randall Kroszner as his nominees to serve on the Board of Governors. Warsh's term, which would have succeeded Bernanke's abrupt tenure, was set to end in January 2018. Warsh, who would be the youngest member of the Federal Reserve Board of Governors after his confirmation, received praise and criticism from some economists; while proponents of his nomination noted that he had practical experience in financial markets, opponents asserted that he was too young and did not have enough experience.

Warsh appeared before the Senate Committee on Banking, Housing, and Urban Affairs on February 14, 2006. Despite his lack of monetary policy experience, Alabama senator Richard Shelby, the committee's chairman, supported Warsh. He told the committee that a slowing housing market—which had experienced a gradual rise—presented potential complications for the Federal Reserve. Warsh remained open to the possibility of inflation targeting, so long as it did not constrict the Federal Reserve's decision-making on other economic factors. The Senate Committee on Banking, Housing, and Urban Affairs advanced Warsh and Kroszner's nomination in a 20–0 vote on February 16. The following day, the Senate voted to confirm them by voice vote.

==== Tenure as governor ====
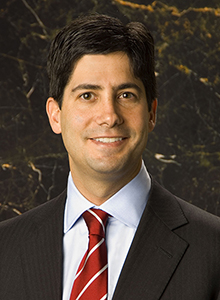
Warsh as a member of the Board of Governors, c. 2006

Warsh was sworn in on February 24, 2006, by Vice President Dick Cheney at the Eisenhower Executive Office Building. He became known as a key ally of Bernanke and a conduit for executives in financial markets, specializing in Wall Street finance. Warsh expressed concerns about persistent inflation in remarks before the New York Stock Exchange in November, defying figures indicating that price pressures were being eased. After fears of a worldwide financial crisis mounted in February 2007, he remained optimistic about market liquidity. Warsh testified before the House Committee on Financial Services in July, stating that the subprime mortgage crisis did not yet present systemic risk. He was an initial critic of protecting systemically important financial institutions. Warsh was involved in securing an emergency loan to secure Bear Stearns.

Warsh was significantly involved in the Federal Reserve's response to the financial crisis. According to David Wessel's In FED We Trust (2010), Warsh was among the "Four Musketeers", a consortium of policymakers at the Federal Reserve who led the central bank through the crisis, including Bernanke; vice chairman Donald Kohn; and Timothy Geithner, the president of the Federal Reserve Bank of New York. He was an opponent of allowing Freddie Mac and Fannie Mae to acquire additional assets and sought to regulate the entities, leaving open the possibility of acquiring them. Alongside Geithner, Warsh managed Lehman Brothers's various assets. Amid concerns involving Wachovia's acquisition of Golden West Financial, he proposed a merger between Wachovia and Morgan Stanley, and urged Robert K. Steel, the chief executive of Wachovia, to sell his firm to Goldman Sachs. Warsh additionally suggested to Gary Cohn, the president of Morgan Stanley, that his firm merge with Citigroup.

Warsh was involved in the sale of Bear Stearns to JPMorgan Chase, the bankruptcy of Lehman Brothers, and the bailout of American International Group. Warsh and Geithner negotiated the agreement that converted Morgan Stanley and Goldman Sachs into bank holding companies. Emails obtained by congressional investigators indicated that Warsh was sharply critical of Bank of America's decision to attempt to withdraw from acquiring Merrill. He pressured the company's board to find a successor to its chief executive, Ken Lewis. By January 2009, Warsh was among several candidates being considered to succeed Geithner as the president of the Federal Reserve Bank of New York. He was considered a leading candidate alongside William C. Dudley, but withdrew himself from consideration that month. By July 2009, Warsh had widely been expected to leave the Federal Reserve Board of Governors.

In September 2009, Warsh expressed the hawkish belief that the Federal Reserve should be prepared to raise interest rates, indicating that the central bank was deviating from the gradual interest rate increases championed by chairman Alan Greenspan. He was critical of purchasing mortgage debt or government bonds and skeptical of preemptive action to further expand the Federal Reserve's portfolio. In an opinion article for The Wall Street Journal, Warsh wrote that he had doubts Bernanke's plan to purchase US$600 billion in Treasury securities would improve the U.S. economy, though he voted for it. On February 10, 2011, Warsh announced that he would resign as a member of the Federal Reserve Board of Governors at the end of March.

=== 2011–2025: Post-governor work ===
After leaving the Federal Reserve Board of Governors, Warsh became a partner at the Duquesne Family Office, the firm of Stanley Druckenmiller, and he served on the board of directors of United Parcel Service and Coupang. He became the Shepard Family Distinguished Visiting Fellow at the Hoover Institution and a visiting scholar at the Stanford Graduate School of Business. Prior to the expected conclusion of Janet Yellen's term as chair of the Federal Reserve in 2018, Warsh was considered to be a possible nominee to succeed her.

=== 2026–present: Chair of the Federal Reserve ===
==== Nomination and confirmation ====
In March 2024, The Wall Street Journal reported that economic advisors to Donald Trump had presented him with several possible options to succeed Jerome Powell as chair of the Federal Reserve, including Warsh.

After his victory in that year's presidential election, Trump began reexamining his possible nominees for secretary of the treasury amid concerns about Howard Lutnick and Scott Bessent. According to The New York Times, Trump considered Warsh to serve as secretary of the treasury.

Trump had proposed nominating Warsh as secretary of the treasury and eventually as chair of the Federal Reserve after Powell's term was set to expire. Trump later nominated Bessent to serve as secretary of the treasury.

After Trump renewed his feud with Powell, Warsh was among several candidates seen as his possible successors.

In July 2025, the competition between Warsh and Kevin Hassett, the director of the National Economic Council, had intensified into the type of "boardroom drama" that Trump engaged in on The Apprentice (2004–2017). The following month, Trump stated that the search for a successor to Powell had narrowed to three candidates, believed to be Warsh; Hassett; and Christopher Waller, a member of the Federal Reserve Board of Governors who was favored by Trump advisors. Bessent later confirmed the names and added that the possible candidates also included Michelle Bowman, another member of the board, and the executive Rick Rieder. Interviews for the position concluded in December.

In January 2026, Trump stated that he preferred that Hassett remain at the National Economic Council. That month, The New York Times reported that Trump was set to name Warsh as his nominee for chair of the Federal Reserve. On January 30, Trump announced that he would nominate Warsh as chair of the Federal Reserve.

Warsh's nomination occurred amid a federal investigation into Powell. North Carolina senator Thom Tillis, a member of the Senate Committee on Banking, Housing, and Urban Affairs, stated that he would block Warsh's nomination until the inquiry's conclusion. Bessent sought to have the committee begin hearings on Warsh's nomination despite Tillis's blockade. A federal judge dismissed several grand jury subpoenas in the investigation into Powell in March; Jeanine Pirro, the United States attorney for the District of Columbia, continued to pursue the case, threatening Warsh's nomination.

As Warsh's committee hearing neared in April 2026, several Republicans in the Senate publicly expressed discontent with the investigation, including Senate majority leader John Thune. He appeared before the Senate Committee on Banking, Housing, and Urban Affairs on April 21. Warsh asserted that he would be a "strictly independent" chairman, rejecting possible calls by Trump to cut interest rates. He advocated for various reforms to the Federal Reserve, including decreasing its portfolio. After the hearing, the Department of Justice announced that it was ending the inquiry into Powell, enabling his path to confirmation. After Tillis ended his objections to Warsh's nomination, the Senate Committee on Banking, Housing, and Urban Affairs voted to advance Warsh to the Senate in a 13–11 vote along party lines on April 29. The following day, Thune filed cloture on Warsh's nomination.

The Senate voted to advance Warsh's nomination in a 49–44 vote on May 11, 2026. The vote was largely along party lines, though Democratic senators John Fetterman of Pennsylvania and Chris Coons of Delaware voted in favor of advancing the nomination. Warsh was confirmed as a member of the Federal Reserve Board of Governors in a 51–45 vote the following day. On May 13, the Senate voted to confirm Warsh as the chair of the Federal Reserve in a 54–45 vote. Fetterman was the only Democratic senator to vote in favor of the board nomination and the chair nomination. New York senator Kirsten Gillibrand did not vote. The vote to confirm Warsh as chair of the Federal Reserve was the narrowest in U.S. history.

In August, Warsh reaffirmed the Federal Reserve's 2% long-term inflation target, measured by the personal consumption expenditures price index, describing it as a "firm, fixed target." In a speech at the Federal Reserve Bank of Kansas City's annual economic symposium in Jackson Hole, Wyoming, he said inflation remained above the target and emphasized that short-term interest rates were the Federal Reserve's primary tool for fulfilling its dual mandate.

==== Tenure as chair ====
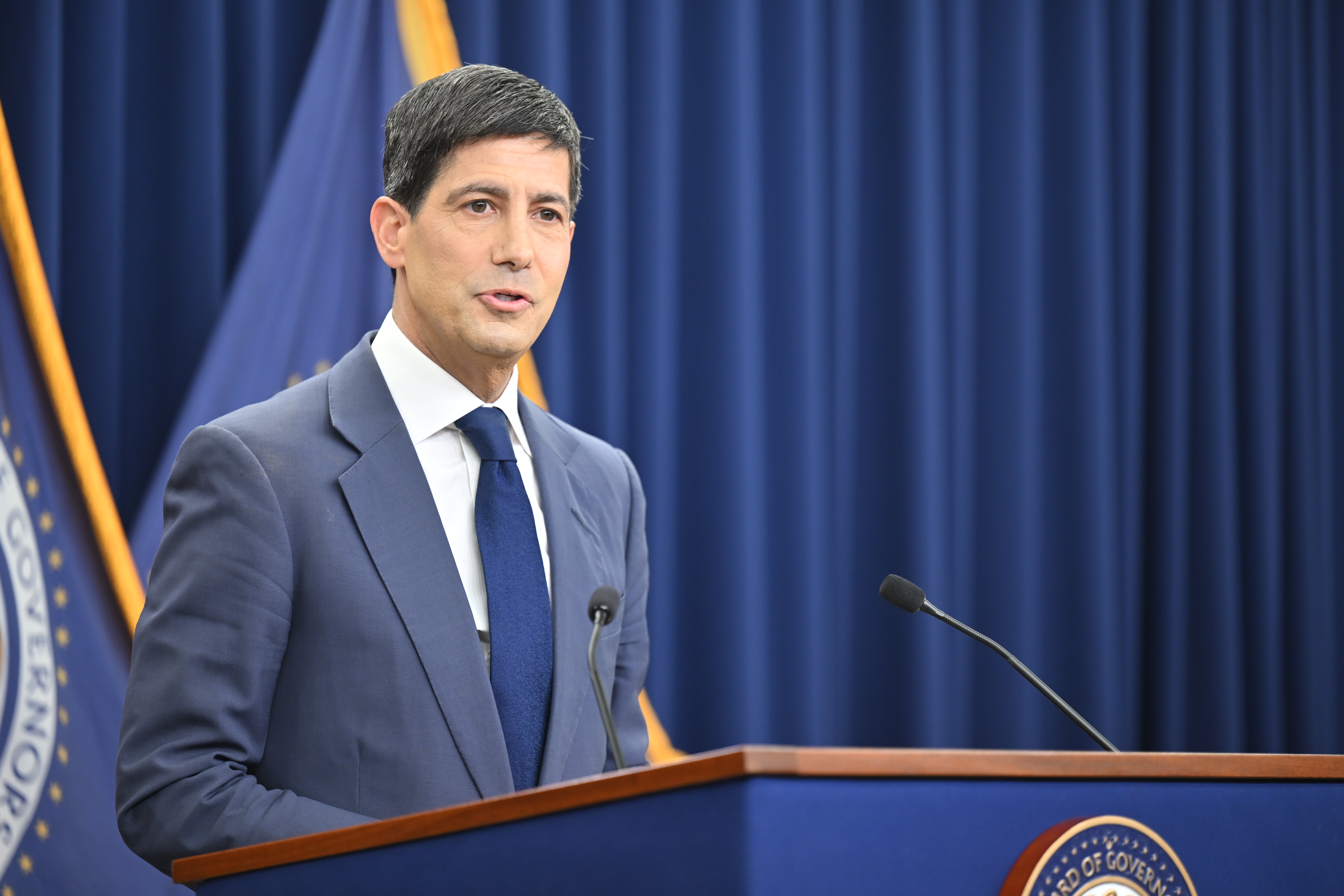
Warsh at his first Federal Open Market Committee press conference in June 2026

Prior to his confirmation, the Federal Reserve experienced several challenges, including Donald Trump's efforts to oust Jerome Powell and Lisa Cook, a member of the Board of Governors; Trump's calls for lower interest rates despite the Iran war fuel crisis; a balance sheet exceeding US$6 trillion in assets; and internal divisions within the Federal Open Market Committee. Warsh was sworn in by Justice Clarence Thomas at the White House on May 22, 2026. He was the first chair of the Federal Reserve to take office in the White House since Alan Greenspan in 1987. In June, Warsh moved to appoint Paul Winfree and Daniel Heil as temporary policy advisors; Winfree had previously authored a section of Project 2025's Mandate for Leadership (2023) concerning the Federal Reserve.

Warsh held his first Federal Open Market Committee meeting in June 2026. The meeting marked the introduction of several reforms to the Federal Reserve, including a shorter policy statement from the central bank. Warsh announced that he would establish several task forces on monetary policy, including communication and the Federal Reserve's balance sheet. He stated that he did not submit a public quarterly rate projection on the Federal Reserve's "dot plot", an indication of Warsh's criticism of forward guidance.

On September 16, 2026, the Federal Open Market Committee voted unanimously to raise the target range for the federal funds rate by 0.25 percentage point to 3.75%-4%, citing elevated inflation.

== Wealth ==
In January 2006, Warsh's filing to the Office of Government Ethics indicated that he and his wife, the heiress Jane Lauder, had US$65.3 million in assets, with Warsh and his joint accounts holding between US$916,000 and US$2.07 million in assets. The Financial Markets Center estimated that he was "the wealthiest individual to serve on the board in many years". The 2008 financial crisis lowered Warsh's wealth to a range between US$670,000 and US$1.4 million by July 2009. His wealth increased to between US$802,000 and US$1.8 million the following year.

In April 2026, Warsh disclosed over US$100 million in assets, including two holdings in the Juggernaut Fund, a hedge fund associated with the Duquesne Family Office.

== Views ==
Warsh is a Republican. He donated US$1,000 to George W. Bush's campaign in the 2000 presidential election and an additional US$1,000 to his reelection campaign in the 2004 election.

=== Monetary policy ===
According to The New York Times, Warsh's views on inflation and interest rates are uncertain. As a member of the Federal Reserve Board of Governors from 2006 to 2011, he was considered hawkish on interest rates. He later expressed the view that the Federal Reserve was not quick enough in cutting interest rates after an inflation surge that began in the COVID-19 pandemic. Warsh attributed the inflation surge to regulations imposed by the Biden administration and government spending with high employment.

Amid the 2008 financial crisis, Warsh argued that the Taylor rule had largely been proved accurate, though he conceded that it failed to predict the crisis. In September 2012, Warsh claimed that the release of the iPhone 5 would have a greater impact on the economy than the Federal Reserve's efforts at quantitative easing. In May 2018, Warsh argued that the Federal Reserve should consider using blockchain technology to establish its own cryptocurrency.

=== Financial regulations ===
In May 2006, Warsh stated that the Federal Reserve should intensify efforts to regulate hedge funds. In February 2010, he called for countries to coordinate on regulatory reform. Warsh called for greater market discipline and the simplification of regulations enacted following the 2008 financial crisis.

=== Economic issues ===
In an essay written alongside former Florida governor Jeb Bush in 2011, Warsh criticized protectionism.

== Works cited ==
- Lowenstein, Roger (2011). The End of Wall Street. London: Penguin Press. ISBN 978-0-143-11872-5.
- Sorkin, Andrew (2009). Too Big to Fail: The Inside Story of How Wall Street and Washington Fought to Save the Financial System—and Themselves. New York City: Viking Press. ISBN 978-0-670-02125-3.
- Wessel, David (2010). In FED We Trust: Ben Bernanke's War on the Great Panic. New York City: Crown Publishing Group. ISBN 978-0-307-45969-5.

Government offices
Preceded by Ben Bernanke	Member of the Federal Reserve Board of Governors; 2006–2011	Succeeded by Jeremy C. Stein
Preceded by Jerome Powell	Chair of the Federal Reserve; 2026–present	Incumbent
Preceded by Stephen Miran	Member of the Federal Reserve Board of Governors; 2026–present	Incumbent
U.S. order of precedence (ceremonial)
Preceded by Dan Caine as Chairman of the Joint Chiefs of Staff	Order of precedence of the United States as Chair of the Federal Reserve	Succeeded by Frank Bisignano as Commissioner of the Social Security Administration
