= Eric Zinterhofer =

American banker

- Born: Eric Louis Zinterhofer; August 1971 (age 55)
- Education: University of Pennsylvania (BA); Harvard University (MBA)
- Occupation: Private equity financier
- Title: Founding partner, Searchlight Capital Partners
- Spouse: Aerin Lauder (m. 1996)
- Children: 2 sons

Eric Louis Zinterhofer (born August 1971) is an American private equity financier who is a founding partner of Searchlight Capital Partners.

== Early life ==
Eric Zinterhofer was born in August 1971. He is the son of Louis J. M. Zinterhofer and Susan A. Zinterhofer of Rumson, New Jersey. He earned a bachelor's degree from the University of Pennsylvania and an MBA from Harvard Business School.

== Career ==
In his early career, Zinterhofer worked at Morgan Stanley as a financial analyst. In 1998, he took a job under Leon Black at Apollo Global Management. In 2010, he co-founded Searchlight Capital with Oliver Haarmann and Erol Uzumeri.

Zinterhofer was the chairman of Charter Communications from 2009 to 2016 and returned to the role in 2023 upon Tom Rutledge's retirement. In 2025, he joined the board of Estée Lauder. He will become president of the Board of Trustees at Phillips Academy Andover in July 2026.

== Personal life ==
In June 1996, Zinterhofer married billionaire heiress Aerin Lauder, the daughter of Ronald Lauder in his home at Wainscott, Long Island, New York, with Rabbi Peter J. Rubinstein presiding. They have two sons.

They live in New York City and have homes in Easthampton, New York, and Aspen, Colorado.
