= Leonard Lauder =

American billionaire and philanthropist (1933–2025)

- Born: Leonard Alan Lauter; March 19, 1933; New York City, U.S
- Died: June 14, 2025 (aged 92); New York City, U.S.
- Education: University of Pennsylvania (BS); Columbia University (MBA)
- Occupations: Businessman; art collector
- Known for: Chairman emeritus – Estée Lauder Companies
- Spouses: Evelyn Hausner (m. 1959; died 2011) Judy Ellis Glickman (m. 2015)
- Children: 2, including William P. Lauder
- Mother: Estée Lauder
- Relatives: Ronald Lauder (brother); Aerin Lauder Zinterhofer (niece); Jane Lauder Warsh (niece)

Leonard Alan Lauder (March 19, 1933 – June 14, 2025) was an American billionaire, philanthropist and art collector. Together, he and his brother, Ronald Lauder, were the sole heirs to the Estée Lauder Companies cosmetics fortune, founded in 1946 by their parents, Estée and Joseph Lauder. Having been its CEO until 1999, Leonard was the chairman emeritus of the Estée Lauder Companies. During his tenure as the CEO, the company went public at the New York Stock Exchange in 1996 and acquired several major cosmetics brands, including MAC Cosmetics, Aveda, Bobbi Brown, and La Mer.

In 2013, Lauder promised his collection of Cubist art to the Metropolitan Museum of Art. The collection is valued at over $1 billion and constitutes one of the largest gifts in the museum's history.

At the time of his death, Forbes estimated his net worth at US$9.7 billion.

== Early life and education ==
Lauder was born in New York City on March 19, 1933, the elder son of Joseph and Estée Lauder and the elder brother of Ronald Lauder. His family is Jewish. He graduated from the Wharton School of the University of Pennsylvania, and also studied at Columbia University's Graduate School of Business before serving as a lieutenant in the United States Navy.

== Career ==
He joined Estée Lauder in 1958 when he was 25. He created the company's first research and development laboratory in the mid-1990s and was responsible for the company acquiring brands like MAC Cosmetics, Bobbi Brown, and Aveda. Under his leadership in the late 1980s, Estée Lauder opened its first store in Moscow with support from the Gosbank daughter, Moscow Narodny Bank in London.

In 1986, Lauder hosted a New York City luncheon attended by Donald Trump and Soviet Ambassador to the United States Yuri Dubinin during which Trump hashed out his partnership with the Kremlin.

Lauder stepped down as CEO of Estée Lauder in 1999.

Lauder gained notoriety in 2001 for creating the Lipstick index, a since-discredited economic indicator, meant to reflect a proclivity to spend money on luxury items, even in the face of crisis.

== Art collection ==
Lauder was a major art collector (he began by buying Art Deco postcards when he was six), but his particular focus, rather than on American artists, was on works by the Cubist masters Picasso, Braque, Gris, and Léger. He also collected Klimt. Much of his art comes from some of the world's most celebrated collections, including those of Gertrude Stein, the Swiss banker Raoul La Roche, and the British art historian Douglas Cooper.

In 2012, the Museum of Fine Arts in Boston opened an exhibition of 700 of his postcards, a tiny part of the promised gift he made to the museum of 120,000 postcards: The Postcard Age: Selections from the Leonard A. Lauder Collection. In an interview in The New Yorker, Lauder explained how postcards turned him into a collector, and how these "mini-masterpieces" remained his lifelong pursuit to the point where his late wife, Evelyn, called the collection his "mistress". He donated his collection of Oilette postcards, published by Raphael Tuck & Sons, to Chicago's Newberry Library, and funded their digitization; the Newberry launched the 26,000-item Tuck digital collection in 2019.

Lauder's interest in postcards led him to be acquainted with one of the owners of the Gotham Book Mart, a Manhattan bookstore, and he sought to help the Gotham re-establish its presence in the city when the owner had sold its long-time building and needed a new space. Lauder bought a building at 16 East 46th Street along with a partner, letting the building's storefront space to the Gotham. Later, the Gotham fell behind on rents, eventually resulting in Lauder and his partner to file for eviction. In a much-publicized closure of the bookstore, the New York City Marshal later auctioned the store's inventory, which was bought in a lot by Lauder and his partner to some protest from many other independent book sellers and collectors who were present at the proceedings and hoping to purchase some of the bibliophilic treasures.

== Philanthropy ==
=== Arts and culture ===
Lauder had long been a major benefactor of the Whitney Museum of American Art. In 1971, he joined the museum's acquisitions board and in 1977, by then president of his family's business, he became a Whitney trustee. He became president in 1990 and was chairman beginning in 1994. He donated both money and many works of art to the Whitney, and was the museum's most prolific fundraiser. His 2008 donation of $131 million is the largest in the museum's history. Through the Leonard and Evelyn Lauder Fund, he and his wife sponsored several exhibitions at the Whitney. The fifth-floor permanent collection galleries are named for the couple. In 1998, he told a reporter for The New York Times that his "dream job" was to be the Whitney Museum's director. Most recently, Lauder gave $131 million for the Whitney's endowment.

A long-time supporter of the Metropolitan Museum of Art in New York City, Lauder led the creation of a research center for Modern art at the museum, which he helped support through a $22 million endowment made alongside museum trustees and other benefactors. In April 2013, he promised his collection of 81 pieces of Cubist art, consisting of 34 pieces by Pablo Picasso, 17 by Georges Braque, 15 by Fernand Léger, and 15 by Juan Gris to the museum; together, they are valued at more than one billion dollars. It has been described by William Acquavella, of Acquavella Galleries, as "without doubt the most important collection any private person has put together in many, many years," Art historian Emily Braun, who co-organized the 2014 Met exhibition of Lauder's Cubist collection with Rebecca Rabinow, was Lauder's personal curator from 1987 onwards.

=== Social causes ===
Lauder was co-founder and chairman of the Alzheimer's Drug Discovery Foundation, a member of the Council on Foreign Relations, a trustee of the Aspen Institute, chairman of The Aspen Institute International Committee, honorary chair of the Breast Cancer Research Foundation, and a member of the President's Council of Memorial Sloan-Kettering Hospital. Along with his wife, Evelyn, he helped create the Evelyn H Lauder Breast Center at Memorial Sloan-Kettering Cancer Center in New York City and the Breast Cancer Research Foundation. In February 2022, he donated $125 million to University of Pennsylvania to establish a new tuition-free nurse practitioner program within University of Pennsylvania School of Nursing.

== Personal life and death ==
Lauder married Evelyn Hausner in July 1959. They had two sons, William, executive chairman of the Estée Lauder Companies, and Gary, managing director of Lauder Partners LLC. For many years, he resided on the Upper East Side of Manhattan.

In 2015, four years after Evelyn died from nongenetic ovarian cancer, Lauder married photographer Judy Glickman. Glickman was the widow of one of Lauder’s closest friends, Albert Glickman. The two were married for a decade until Lauder’s death on 14 June 2025.

Lauder, unlike his brother, supported Kathy Hochul's first campaign for New York governor in 2022.

Lauder died at his home in Manhattan, New York City on June 14, 2025, at the age of 92.

=== Memoir ===
Lauder's memoir, The Company I Keep: My Life in Beauty was published in 2020.

== Awards and honors ==
Year	Title
2003	Golden Plate Award of the American Academy of Achievement, presented by Awards Council member Ehud Barak
2017	Bronx Science Hall of Fame
2019	Women's Leadership Award
2020	World Retail Hall of Fame

== See also ==
- Lauder Institute
- The World's Billionaires
