= Estée Lauder (businesswoman) =

American businesswoman (1908–2004)

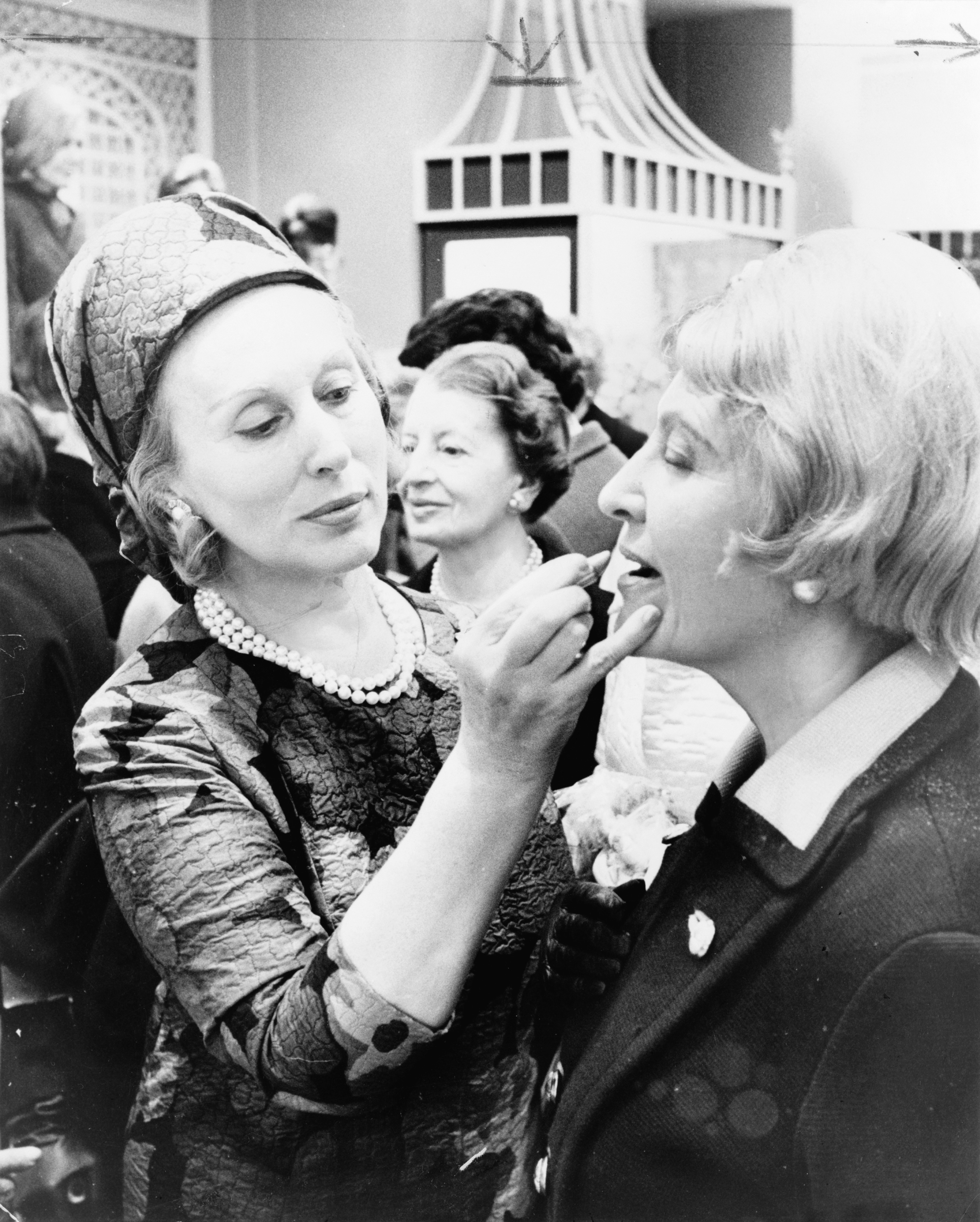
- Lauder (left) with a customer in 1966
- Born: Josephine Esther Mentzer; July 1, 1908; New York City, U.S.
- Died: April 24, 2004 (aged 95); New York City, U.S.
- Occupation: Businesswoman
- Known for: Co-founder of Estée Lauder Companies
- Spouses: Joseph Lauder (m. 1930; div. 1939) (m. 1942; died 1983)
- Children: Leonard; Ronald
- Relatives: William P. Lauder (grandson); Aerin Lauder (granddaughter); Jane Lauder (granddaughter)

Estée Lauder (/ˈɛsteɪ ˈlɔːdər/ EST-ay LAW-dər; born Josephine Esther Mentzer; July 1, 1908 – April 24, 2004) was an American businesswoman. She co-founded her eponymous cosmetics company with her husband, Joseph Lauter (later Lauder). Lauder was the only woman on Time magazine's 1998 list of the 20 most influential business geniuses of the 20th century.

== Early life and education ==
Lauder was born Josephine Esther Mentzer in Corona, Queens, New York City, the second child born to Rose Schotz, born in Sátoraljaújhely, Hungary, and Max Mentzer, born in Pozsony (now Bratislava, Slovakia). Her parents were Hungarian Jewish immigrants. Her maternal grandmother was from Sátoraljaújhely and her maternal grandfather was from Gelle (now Holice, Slovakia), while her father had Czech-Jewish ancestry. Lauder's claims of descent from European aristocracy were discredited in a biography, Estée Lauder: Beyond the Magic (1985) by Lee Israel. Her New York Times obituary observed "she was a New Yorker and not an aristocrat at all", notwithstanding "the mythmaking that is so much of the magic of the beauty industry". Her "favourite story was that she had been brought up by her Viennese mother in fashionable Flushing, Long Island, in a sumptuous home with stables, a chauffeured car and an Italian nurse."

In actuality, in 1898 her mother Rose had emigrated from Hungary to the United States with her five children at the time to join her first husband, Abraham Rosenthal. In 1905, Rose married Max Mentzer, a shopkeeper who had also immigrated to the United States in the 1890s. When their daughter was born, they wanted to name her Eszti, the diminutive form of the Hungarian first name Eszter, after her mother's favorite Hungarian aunt, but decided at the last minute to keep the name "Josephine", which they had agreed upon. However, the baby's nickname became "Estee", the name she would grow up using and responding to. Eventually, when she launched her perfume empire with her husband, she added an accent mark to make her name look French and began pronouncing it the way her father had in his Hungarian accent.

Lauder spent much of her childhood trying to make ends meet. Like most of her eight siblings, she worked at the family's hardware store, where she got her first taste of business, entrepreneurship, and what it takes to be a successful retailer. Her childhood dream was to become an actress with her "name in lights, flowers and handsome men".

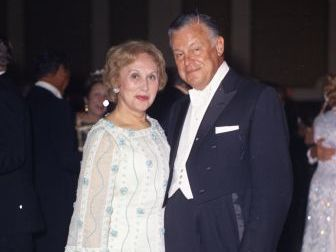
Estée and Joseph Lauder in 1971

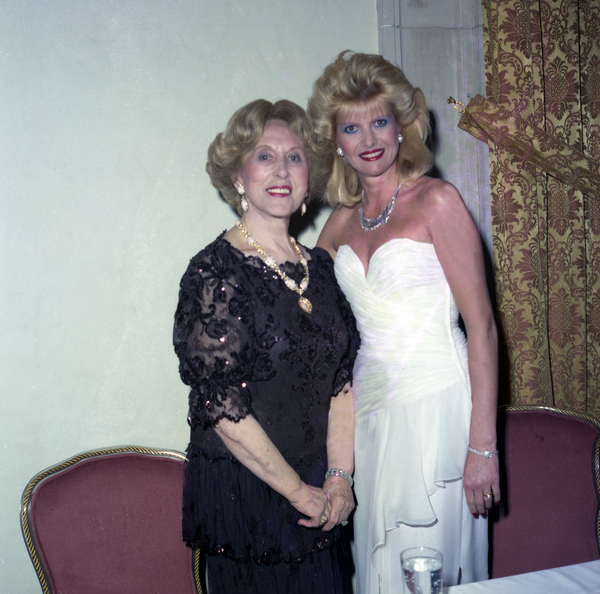
Lauder (left) with Ivana Trump in 1986

When Lauder grew older, she agreed to help her maternal uncle, Dr. John Schotz, with his business. Schotz was a chemist, and his company, New Way Laboratories, sold beauty products such as creams, lotions, rouge, and fragrances. She became more interested in his business than her father's. She was fascinated watching her uncle create his products. He also taught her how to wash her face and do facial massages. After graduating from Newtown High School in Elmhurst, Queens, New York, she focused on her uncle's business.

== Career ==
Lauder named one of her uncle's blends Super Rich All-Purpose Cream. She began selling the preparation to her friends. She sold Six-In-One cold cream and Dr. Schotz's Viennese Cream to beauty shops, beach clubs and resorts. One day, as she was getting her hair done at the House of Ash Blondes, the salon's owner Florence Morris asked Lauder about her perfect skin. Soon, Estée returned to the beauty parlor to hand out four of her uncle's creams and demonstrate their use. Morris was so impressed that she asked Lauder to sell her products at Morris's new salon.

In 1946, Estée and Joseph Lauder launched Estée Lauder Cosmetic Co., located at 501 Madison Avenue (East 52nd Street), New York 22, New York, built in 1929 by Kohn, Knight & Vitolo.

In 1953, Lauder introduced her first fragrance, Youth-Dew, a bath oil that doubled as a perfume. Instead of using French perfumes by the drop behind each ear, women began using Youth-Dew by the bottle in their bath water. In the first year, it sold 50,000 bottles; by 1984, the figure had risen to 150 million.

Lauder was the subject of a 1985 TV documentary, Estée Lauder: The Sweet Smell of Success. Explaining her success, she said, "I have never worked a day in my life without selling. If I believe in something, I sell it, and I sell it hard."

== Awards and honors ==
Lauder received the Chevalier (Knight) class of the Legion of Honour from the Consul General of France, Gerard Causer, on January 16, 1978. She was the first woman to receive this honor.

She was inducted to the Junior Achievement U.S. Business Hall of Fame in 1988. She received the Presidential Medal of Freedom in 2004.

== Personal life ==
In her early twenties, Estée met Joseph Lauter, whose father had emigrated from Austria. On January 15, 1930, they married. Their surname was later changed from Lauter to Lauder. Their first child, Leonard, was born March 19, 1933. The couple separated then divorced in 1939 and she moved to Florida, but they remarried in 1942. Their second son, Ronald, was born in 1944. Estée and Joseph Lauder remained married until his death in 1983. Later, she regretted her divorce, saying that she had married young and assumed she had missed out on life but soon found out that she had the "sweetest husband in the world".

Leonard became the chief executive of Estée Lauder and then chairman of the board. Ronald was a Deputy Assistant Secretary of Defense in the Reagan administration and was U.S. Ambassador to Austria in 1986–87. Since 2007 (and as of 2026), he is the president of the World Jewish Congress.

== Death ==
Lauder died of cardiopulmonary arrest on April 24, 2004, aged 95, at her home in Manhattan.

== See also ==
- Estée Lauder Companies
- Lauder family
