= Aerin Lauder =

American businesswoman (born 1970)

- Born: Aerin Rebecca Lauder; April 23, 1970 (age 56)
- Education: University of Pennsylvania
- Occupations: Creative director, Estée Lauder Companies
- Spouse: Eric Zinterhofer (m. 1996)
- Children: 2
- Father: Ronald Lauder
- Relatives: Estée Lauder (grandmother); Jane Lauder (sister); Leonard Lauder (uncle); William P. Lauder (cousin)

Aerin Rebecca Lauder Zinterhofer (born April 23, 1970) is an American billionaire heiress and businesswoman.

== Family and education ==
Lauder is the daughter of Jo Carole Lauder (née Knopf) and Ronald Lauder. Her father served as U.S. Ambassador to Austria under President Ronald Reagan, and is the president of the World Jewish Congress. She is the granddaughter of Estée Lauder and Joseph Lauder, the cofounders of the cosmetics company Estée Lauder Companies. She has one sister, Jane Lauder Warsh.

Lauder graduated from University of Pennsylvania. She worked at the family company during and after college. She then studied at the Annenberg School for Communication at the University of Pennsylvania.

== Career ==
Lauder is the style and image director for the Estée Lauder Companies and has her own cosmetic, perfume, fashion, and furniture line named AERIN. She also has a furniture and accessories collection.

She owns 16 million shares in the Estée Lauder Companies making her worth $2.7 billion as of 2019 and ranking her 319 on the Forbes 400 list of richest Americans.

== Personal life ==
In 1996, Lauder married Eric Zinterhofer in a Jewish ceremony in Wainscott, New York. Zinterhofer is an investment banker, the co-founder of the private equity firm Searchlight Capital Partners and the former co-head of media and telecommunications investing at Apollo Global Management. The couple lives in New York City and East Hampton, New York with their two sons. She also has homes in Aspen, Colorado, Palm Beach, Florida, and on the Pacific coast of Panama.

== Works and publications ==
- Lauder, Aerin, Christine Pittle, and Simon Upton. Beauty at Home. New York: Clarkson Potter, 2013. ISBN 978-0-770-43361-1 OCLC 866853447
- Smith, Clinton Ross, and Aerin Lauder. Veranda: The Romance of Flowers. 2015. Foreword by Lauder. ISBN 9781-6-183-7179-9 OCLC 903424582
- Lauder, Aerin. Aspen Style. New York: Assouline, 2017. ISBN 9781614286226
- Lauder, Aerin. Palm Beach. New York: Assouline, 2019. ISBN 9781614288626

== See also ==
- Estée Lauder Companies
- Lauder family
