= Bobbi Brown =

American professional makeup artist and businessperson (born 1957)

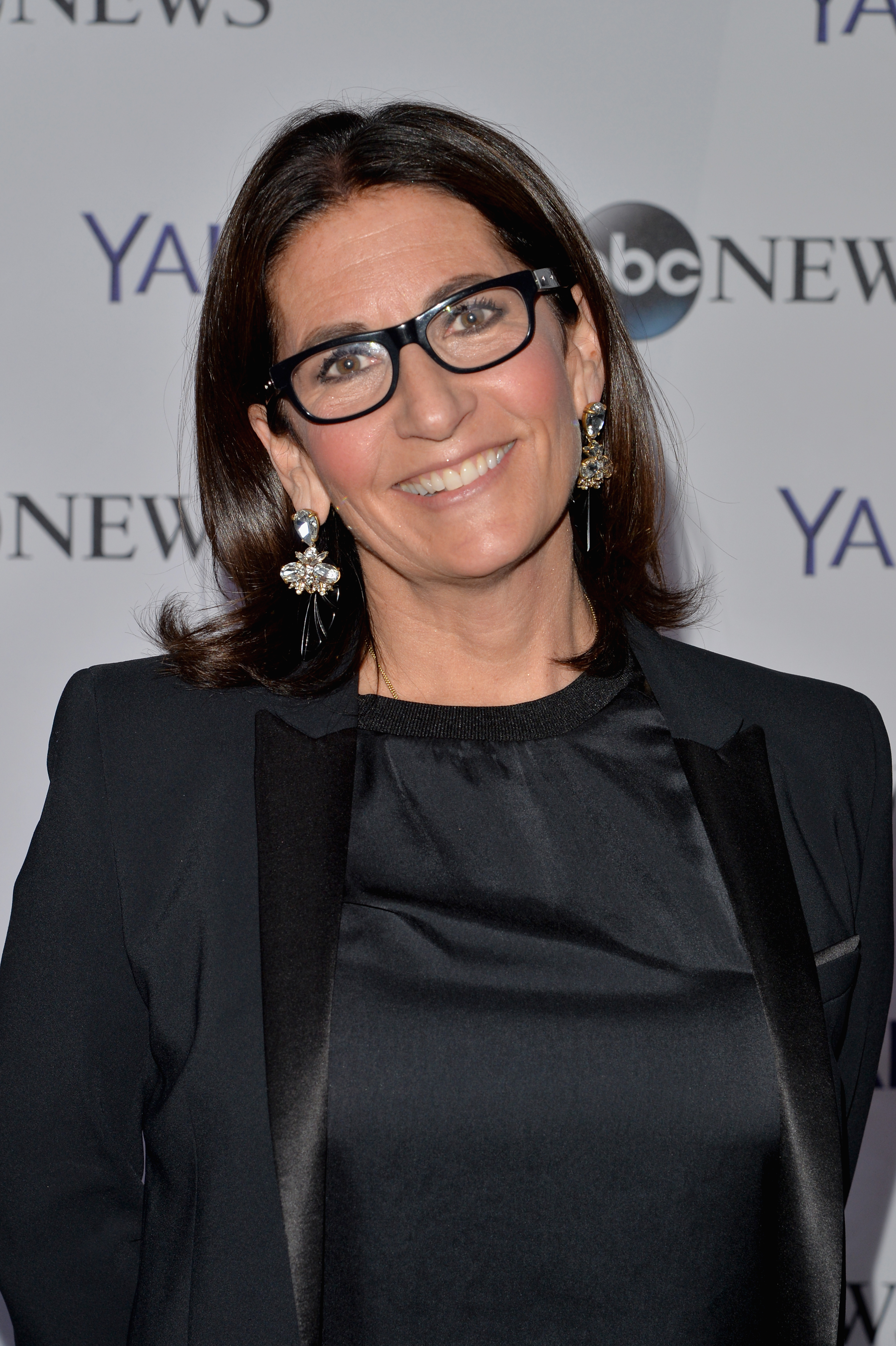
- Brown in 2014
- Born: April 14, 1957 (age 69); Wilmette, Illinois, U.S.
- Education: Emerson College
- Occupations: Make-up artist; businesswoman; entrepreneur
- Years active: 1980−present
- Known for: Founder of Bobbi Brown Cosmetics
- Spouse: Steven Plofker (m. 1988)
- Children: 3

Logo

Bobbi Brown (born April 14, 1957) is an American professional make-up artist, author, and the founder of Bobbi Brown Cosmetics. She created ten natural-shade lipsticks, which, according to Entrepreneur "revolutionized the beauty industry". She has written ten books about beauty and wellness. In 2025, Time magazine listed her as one of the world's 100 most influential people.

After leaving Bobbi Brown Cosmetics in 2016, she launched Beauty Evolution, LLC, and became certified as a health coach through the Institute for Integrative Nutrition. Brown also started a line of beauty-inspired wellness products. and launched a second beauty line, Jones Road, in 2020. Brown curates an editorial website. She and her husband Steven Plofker redesigned The George, a boutique hotel located in Montclair, New Jersey.

== Early life and education ==
Born in Chicago, Illinois to a Jewish family, Joe and Sandra Brown, Brown graduated from New Trier High School and from Emerson College in Boston with a degree in theatrical makeup and photography. In 1980, she moved to New York City to work as a professional makeup artist. Brown became known for a makeup style that included moderate and natural tones, which was a stark contrast to the bright colors used commonly at the time.

== Cosmetic lines ==
=== Bobbi Brown Essentials ===
In 1990, Brown worked with a chemist to come up with ten natural lipstick shades. In 1991, Brown and her husband partnered with another couple to launch the brand Bobbi Brown Essentials, which debuted at Bergdorf Goodman in New York City. She was expecting to sell 100 in a month, but instead sold 100 in a day. The following year, she released yellow-toned foundation sticks.

Estée Lauder bought the company in 1995, retaining Brown as an employee of Bobbi Brown Cosmetics and Brown retained creative control of the makeup line.

In 2011, the first freestanding Bobbi Brown Cosmetics retail store opened in Auckland, New Zealand with a makeup school in the back of the building. In 2012, her cosmetics were estimated to represent approximately ten percent of Estée Lauder Companies' total sales. As of January 2014, there were approximately thirty free-standing Bobbi Brown cosmetics stores.

In December 2016, it was announced that Brown would step down from the company by the end of the year. Following this, she continued creating new lines and participating in the beauty industry through other projects like beauty podcasts, a makeup MasterClass, and her website JustBobbi.com.

=== Jones Road ===
In late October 2020, Bobbi Brown launched her second beauty brand, Jones Road. The launch marked 25 years since she first sold her original line, Bobbi Brown Cosmetics, due to a 25-year non-compete agreement she'd signed with Estee Lauder. It has been described as a "clean beauty" brand. According to Yahoo, which reviewed the line, this "approach is evident in the brand offering: a curated edit of makeup and skincare that doesn't overwhelm." Its original offerings included balms, moisturizing cream colors, mascaras, glosses, washes, eye shadow, eye pencils. They were also sold in combination in a start-up kit. In an interview with the Financial Times in September 2024, it was revealed that the brand's revenue in its first year was $20mn, and expected to be over $150mn in the current financial year, with a valuation approaching $1bln.

=== Other product lines ===
Brown has a collection of fragrances and a collaboration with In 2013 Safilo Group S.p.A. for an eyewear collection. She is a creative consultant at Lord & Taylor.

== Other activities ==
=== Evolution 18 ===
In 2019, she founded Evolution_18, a “lifestyle-inspired wellness line”. The products she developed for the line included supplements, collagen, and effervescent tablets, and were sold at outlets including Walmart.

=== The George Hotel ===
In 2015, Brown and her husband acquired a historic inn located in Montclair, New Jersey, which was built as a private residence in 1902. It became the Georgian Inn in the 1940s, and after they purchased it, they renovated the property and renamed it The George Hotel. The hotel was opened in 2018 and has 32 guest rooms.

=== 18 Label ===
Brown co-founded 18 Label, a film and television studio based in New Jersey. Networks that have filmed in the studio include CNBC, BSTV, and the Food Network. The studio is housed in The Annex (also cofounded by Brown), an 11,000 square foot studio and event center.

Brown has appeared on Food Network series, including The Kitchen.

=== Editorial work ===
Brown is the Beauty & Lifestyle Editor of Elvis Duran and the Morning Show. She partnered with Duran to produce an "Elvis Duran bronzer" as a part of her cosmetics line. Brown served as Yahoo Beauty's Editor-in-Chief from February 2014 to February 2016. A chance meeting with the grandmother of a producer of NBC's Today led to a 12-year run as a regular beauty consultant on the show. Brown has also written columns for PureWow, Naturally, and Danny Seo.

=== Books ===
Year	Title	International Standard Book Number
1995	Bobbi Brown Beauty: The Ultimate Resource	(ISBN 0-446-58134-8)
2000	Bobbi Brown Teenage Beauty: Everything You Need to Look Pretty, Natural, Sexy and Awesome with Annemarie Iverson, New York Times Best Seller	(ISBN 0-06-095724-7)
2002	Bobbi Brown Beauty Evolution: A Guide to a Lifetime of Beauty	(ISBN 0-06-008881-8)
2007	Bobbi Brown Living Beauty	(ISBN 0-8212-5834-6)
2008	Bobbi Brown Makeup Manual: For Everyone from Beginner to Pro	(ISBN 0-446-58134-8)
2010	Bobbi Brown Beauty Rules	(ISBN 0-811-87468-0)
2012	Bobbi Brown Pretty Powerful with Sara Bliss	(ISBN 0-811-87704-3)
2014	Everything Eyes with Sara Bliss	(ISBN 978-1-4521-1961-8)
2017	Beauty from the Inside Out	

== Causes ==
Bobbi Brown Cosmetics launched the Pretty Powerful Campaign for Women & Girls on International Women's Day in 2013. Pretty Powerful supports organizations that seek to empower women through job skills training programs and girls through education. Beneficiaries to date include Dress for Success (of which Brown is a former board member), the Broome Street Academy High School, and the Girl Rising Fund.

== Personal life ==
Brown married executive Steven Plofker on September 10, 1988, and together they have three sons. They also have a daughter-in-law. The family lives in Montclair, New Jersey. She spends her summers in Sag Harbor of the Hamptons, New York.

== Recognition ==
Her work has been featured on the covers of magazines such as Elle, Vogue, Self, and Town & Country.

Brown has received the Glamour Woman of the Year Award, The Fashion Group International Night of Stars Beauty Award, and the Jackie Robinson Foundation's ROBIE Humanitarian Award. She was appointed by President Obama to the Advisory Committee for Trade Policy and Negotiation and has been inducted into the New Jersey Hall of Fame. She holds honorary doctorates from Montclair State University, Fashion Institute of Technology, Monmouth University, and Emerson College. Following the release of her second makeup company in 2020, Allure magazine labeled Brown the "world’s patron saint of 'natural makeup.'"

She was recognized as one of the BBC 100 Women of 2015.
