= Management of hair loss =

- Specialty: Dermatology

The management of hair loss, includes prevention and treatment of baldness, and hair thinning, and regrowth of hair.

== Prevention ==
Scratching of itchy scalp may contribute to hair loss.

=== Health ===
==== Body weight ====
Prevention of obesity helps. Obesity is linked to hair thinning.

==== Healthy diet ====
Oils with fatty acids that has been studied to prevent dermatitis includes:

- Corn oil: Linoleic acid (LA)
- Fish oil: Eicosapentaenoic acid (EPA) and docosahexaenoic acid (DHA)
- Hemp seed oil: Linoleic acid (LA), and alpha-Linolenic acid (ALA)

==== Alternative medicine ====
The scalp must be cleaned from sebum, sweat, and dirt, prior to topical application, for agents to penetrate it.

A 2020 systemic review on agents used to treat androgenic alopecia found that:

- Oral supplementation of vitamin A, B, C, D, E, and trace element iron, selenium, and zinc, will prevent androgenic alopecia caused by malnutrition. Multivitamins can be used.
- Topical application of onion juice, rosemary oil, saw palmetto, pumpkin seed oil, procyanidin, garlic gel, capsaicin, caffeine, amino acids, and curcumin helped prevent hair loss.

=== Heating, ventilation, and air conditioning (HVAC) ===
==== Humidifier ====
A humidifier can be used to prevent low indoor humidity during winter (especially with indoor heating), and dry season.

Commonly, patients with seborrhoeic dermatitis experience mild redness, scaly skin lesions and in some cases hair loss.

Low humidity can cause adverse health effects and may cause atopic dermatitis, and seborrhoeic dermatitis.

== Treatments ==
=== Combination therapy ===
Combinations of finasteride, minoxidil and ketoconazole are more effective than individual use.

Combination therapy of LLLT or microneedling with finasteride or minoxidil demonstrated substantive increases in hair count.

=== Medication ===
Treatments for the various forms of hair loss have only moderate success. Three medications have evidence to support their use in male pattern hair loss: finasteride, dutasteride and minoxidil. They typically work better to prevent further hair loss than to regrow lost hair.

They may be used together when hair loss is progressive or further regrowth is desired after 12 months. Other medications include ketoconazole, and in female androgenic alopecia spironolactone and flutamide.

==== Baricitinib ====
In June 2022, the FDA authorized baricitinib for the treatment of severe alopecia areata.

==== Minoxidil ====
Minoxidil, applied topically, is widely used for the treatment of hair loss. It may be effective in helping promote hair growth in both men and women with androgenic alopecia. About 40% of men experience hair regrowth after 3–6 months. It is the only topical product that is FDA approved in America for androgenic hair loss. However, increased hair loss has been reported.

==== Ketoconazole ====
Ketoconazole may help in women.

==== Antiandrogens ====
===== Finasteride =====
Finasteride is used to treat male pattern hair loss. Treatment provides about 30% improvement in hair loss after six months of treatment, and effectiveness only persists as long as the drug is taken. There is no good evidence for its use in women. It may cause gynecomastia, erectile dysfunction and depression.

===== Dutasteride =====
Dutasteride is also used in the treatment of male pattern hair loss and appears to have better effectiveness than finasteride for the condition. While used off-label for male pattern hair loss in most of the world, dutasteride is specifically approved for this indication in South Korea and Japan.

===== Spironolactone =====
There is tentative support for spironolactone in women. Due to its feminising side effects and risk of infertility it is not often used by men. It can also cause low blood pressure, high blood potassium, and abnormal heart rhythms. Also, women who are pregnant or trying to become pregnant generally cannot use the medication as it is a teratogen, and can cause ambiguous genitalia in newborn children.

===== Flutamide =====
There is tentative evidence for flutamide in women; however, it is associated with relatively high rates of liver problems and strong recommendations have been made against its use. Like spironolactone, flutamide is typically only used by women. Bicalutamide is another option for the treatment of female pattern hair loss. It has a far lower risk of liver toxicity than flutamide and is said to have an excellent safety profile. However, bicalutamide retains a small risk of liver toxicity and for this reason periodic liver monitoring is recommended during treatment.

=== Technological treatments ===
==== Low-level laser therapy (LLLT) ====
Low-level laser therapy or photobiomodulation is also referred to as red light therapy and cold laser therapy. It is a non-invasive treatment option.

LLLT is shown to increase hair density and growth in both genders. The types of devices (hat, comb, helmet) and duration did not alter the effectiveness, with more emphasis to be placed on lasers compared to LEDs. Ultraviolet and infrared light are more effective for alopecia areata, while red light and infrared light is more effective for androgenetic alopecia.

Medical reviews suggest that LLLT is as effective or potentially more than other non invasive and traditional therapies like minoxidil and finasteride but further studies such as RCTs, long term follow up studies, and larger double blinded trials need to be conducted to confirm the initial findings.

=== Platelet-rich plasma (PRP) ===
Using ones own cells and tissues and without harsh side effects, PRP is beneficial for alopecia areata and androgenetic alopecia and can be used as an alternative to minoxidil or finasteride. It has been documented to improve hair density and thickness in both genders. A minimum of 3 treatments, once a month for 3 months are recommended, and afterwards a 3-6 month period of continual appointments for maintenance. Factors that determine efficacy include amount of sessions, double versus single centrifugation, age and gender, and where the PRP is inserted.

Future larger randomized controlled trials and other high quality studies are still recommended to be carried out and published for a stronger consensus. Further development of a standardized practice for procedure is also recommended.

=== Surgical treatments ===
==== Hair transplantation ====
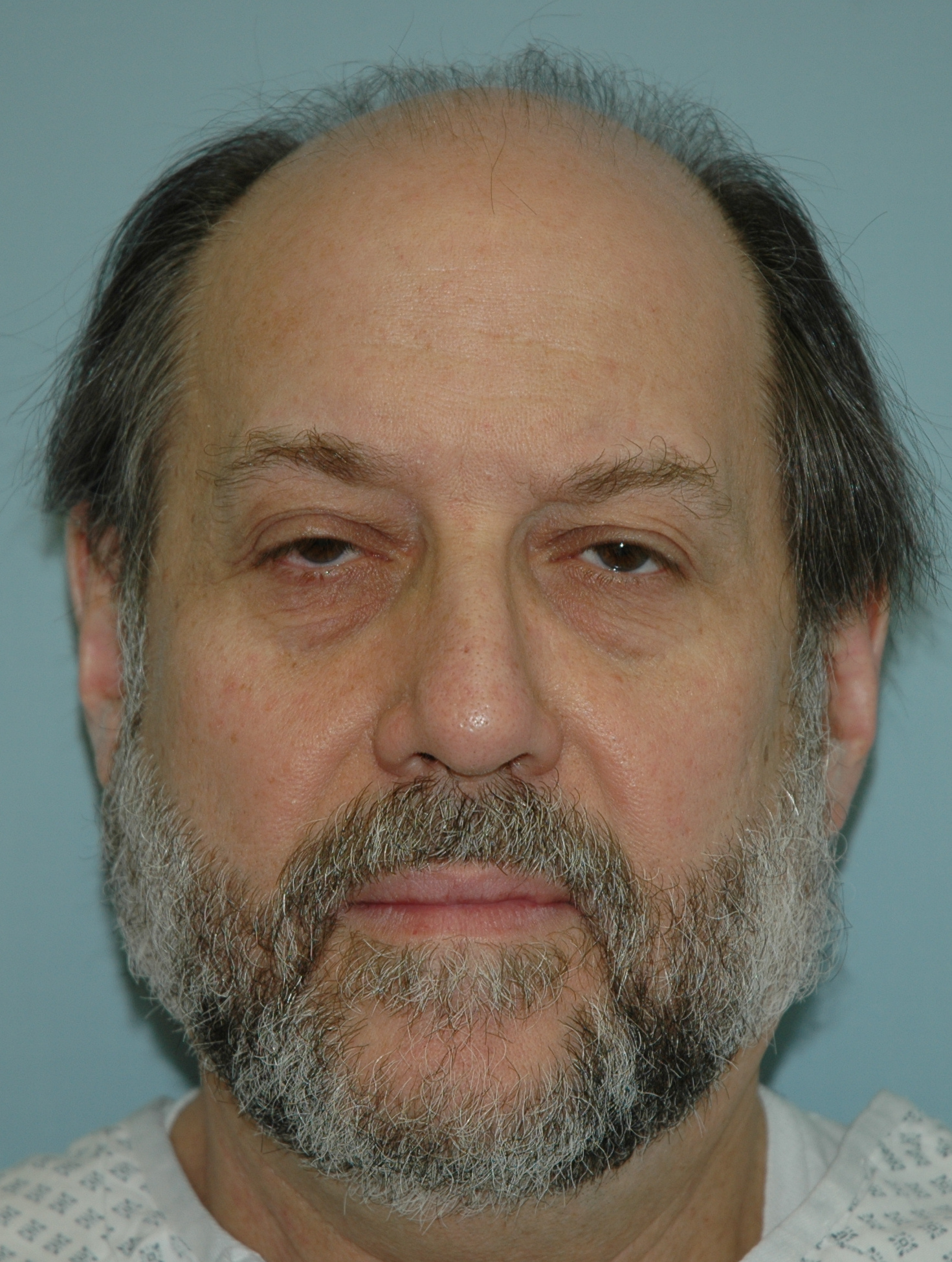
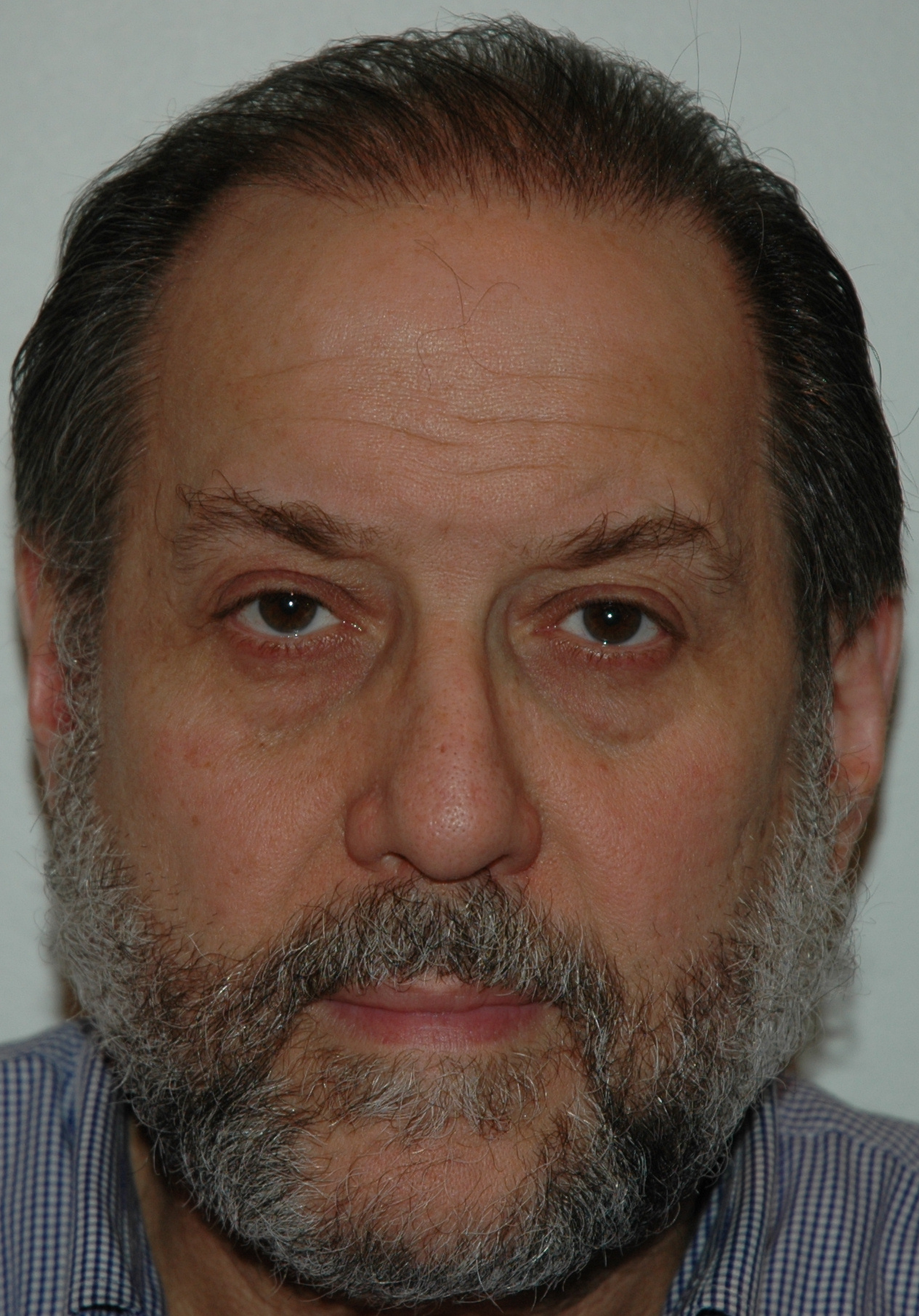
A man before and after a hair transplant.

Hair transplantation is a surgical technique that moves individual hair follicles from a part of the body called the donor site to bald or balding part of the body known as the recipient site. It is primarily used to treat male pattern baldness. In this condition, grafts containing hair follicles that are genetically resistant to balding are transplanted to bald scalp. It is also used to restore eyelashes, eyebrows, beard hair, chest hair, and pubic hair and to fill in scars caused by accidents or surgery such as face-lifts and previous hair transplants. Hair transplantation differs from skin grafting in that grafts contain almost all of the epidermis and dermis surrounding the hair follicle, and many tiny grafts are transplanted rather than a single strip of skin.

Since hair naturally grows in follicles in groups of 1 to 4 hairs, transplantation takes advantage of these naturally occurring follicular units. This achieves a more natural appearance by matching hair for hair through Follicular unit transplantation (FUT).

Donor hair can be harvested in two different ways. Small grafts of naturally occurring units of one to four hairs, called follicular units, can be moved to balding areas of the hair restoration. These follicular units are surgically implanted in the scalp in very close proximity to one another and in large numbers. The grafts are obtained in one or both of the two primary methods of surgical extraction, follicular unit transplantation, colloquially referred to as "strip harvesting", or Follicular Unit Extraction (FUE), in which follicles are transplanted individually.

In FUT, a strip of skin containing many follicular units is extracted from the patient and dissected under a stereoscopic microscope. The site of the strip removal is stitched closed. Once divided into follicular unit grafts, each unit is individually inserted into small recipient sites made by an incision in the bald scalp. In the newer technique, roots are extracted from the donor area and divided into strips for transplantation. The strip, two to three millimeters thick, is isolated and transplanted to the bald scalp. After surgery, a bandage is worn for two days to protect the stitched strip during healing. A small strip scar remains after healing, which can be covered by scalp hair growing over the scar.

==== Scalp reduction ====
Scalp reduction is a surgical procedure in which the hairless region of the scalp of a bald man is reduced. This procedure can reduce the area of the scalp without hair.

== Regrowth of hair ==
=== Facial hair ===
==== Eyebrows ====
Bimatoprost 0.03% has been used to grow eyebrows.

==== Eyelashes ====
The FP receptor agonist, bimatoprost, in the form of an 0.03% ophthalmic solution termed Latisse, is approved by the US Food and Drug Administration to treat hypotrichosis of the eyelashes, in particular to darken and lengthen eyelashes for cosmetic purposes. Also, bimatoprost may be used to treat small or underdeveloped eyelashes.

=== Scalp hair ===
==== Alternative medication ====
===== Topical =====
Some popular plant juices sold as hair serum may, instead of growing human hair, actually inhibit the growth, including 6-gingerol found in ginger.

Among the indigenous peoples of California, plants in the genus Marah were used as a topical treatment for hair loss, with the seeds roasted, mashed, and applied to the scalp as a salve. The cucurbitacins found in Marah are structurally similar to finasteride.

===== Topical crude onion juice =====
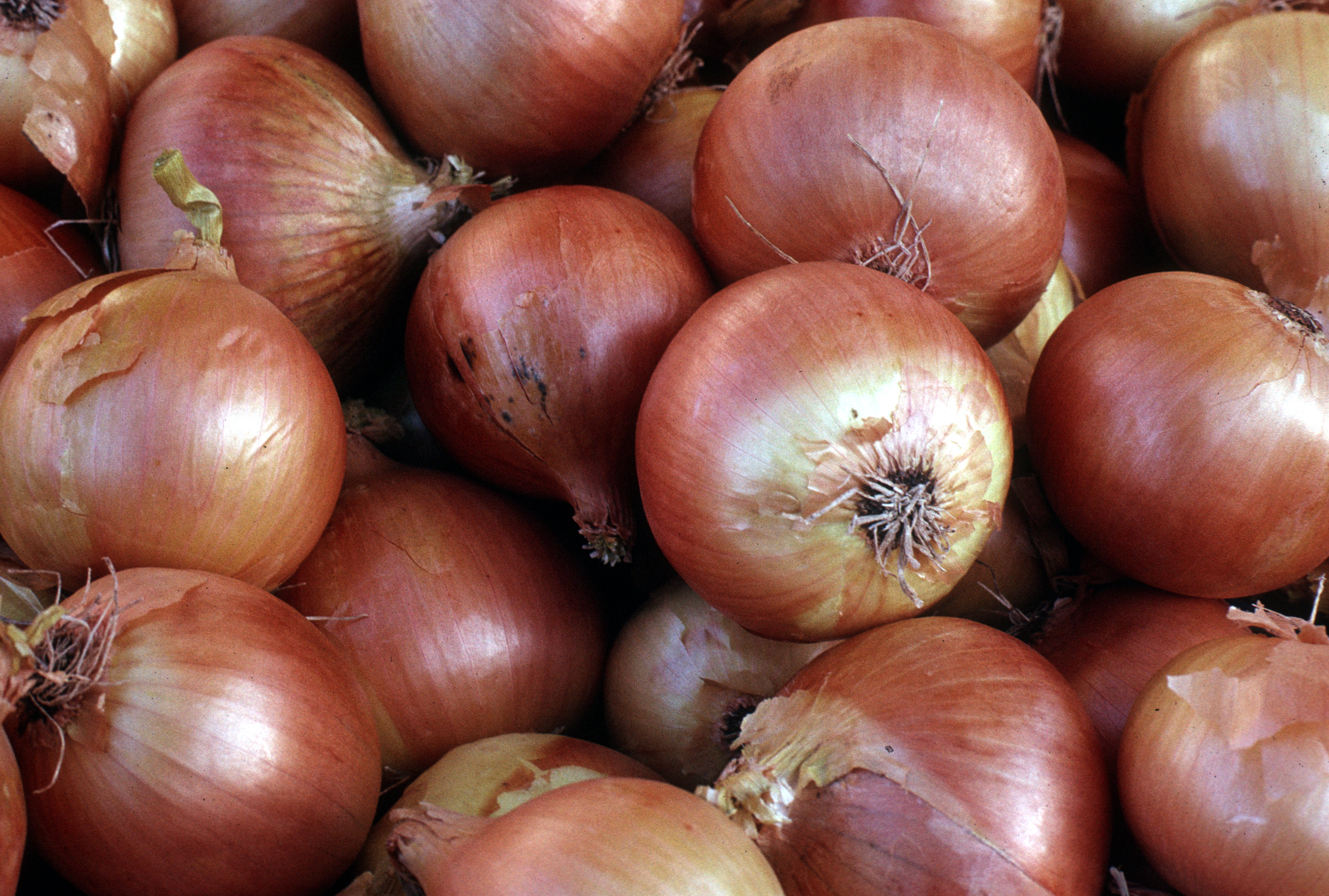
Topical crude onion juice from Australian brown onion was used in a 2002 study to regrow hair in bald people.

A small 2002 study demonstrated that treatment twice daily for six weeks with crude onion juice from Australian brown onion, re-growth hair on alopecia areata (spot baldness) in 86.9% of the 23 participants. Twice as many flavonols are found in red onion than in yellow onion. Also, non-organic onions might contain pesticides on the peel and in the first scaly leaf. Compounds found in onion that stimulate hair growth:

- Quercetin:
  - Quercetin (a flavonoid found in vegan food) supplements, has been suggested to treat baldness. A 2012 study demonstrated that alopecia areata could be used to prevent ant treated with quercetin in mice. Quercetin is found in onions primarily in the peel and the first scaly leaf but not in the flesh. Onion bulb size or weight does not appear to be affected by quercetin concentration.
  - A 2020 study demonstrated that quercitrin stimulated hair shaft growth in cultured human hair follicles.
- Volatile compounds responsible for pungency and tearing in onions when they are cut (e.g. syn-propanethial S-oxide gas). However, no formal studies have been conducted to evaluate if these compounds promote hair growth or if they help other compounds to penetrate the skin to form hair follicles.
  - To use the volatile compounds: Onions must be extracted and applied topically quickly before the volatile compounds evaporate. The extract will cause tearing eyes, but it can be prevented with a shower cap, or a pair of swimming goggles.
  - To discard the volatile compounds: The onion juice is extracted and stored for a short while to evaporate the volatile compounds. The extract will not cause tearing eyes. Also, both genetically modified, and plant breed onions have been produced with significantly reduced levels of tear-inducing lachrymatory factor.

===== Caffeine =====
A 2025 study suggests that caffeine may help with hair growth by stimulating hair follicles and counteracting the effects of DHT, a hormone linked to hair loss. Caffeine is believed to increase blood circulation in the scalp and extend the hair's growth phase, which could potentially help slow down the hair thinning process. While caffeine-based hair products are popular, more research is needed to fully confirm their effectiveness.

===== Dietary supplements =====
Dietary supplements are not typically recommended. Many people use unproven treatments, but there is little evidence of the effectiveness of vitamins, minerals, or other dietary supplements regrowing hair or retaining hair. There is no evidence for biotin (vitamin B7). While lacking both evidence and expert recommendation, there is a large market for hair growth supplements, especially for products that contain biotin.

However, one small trial of saw palmetto which shows tentative benefit in those with mild to moderate androgenetic alopecia. There was no good evidence for gingko, aloe vera, ginseng, bergamot, or hibiscus as of 2011.

== Radiation-induced hair loss ==
Radiation induces hair loss through damage to hair follicle stem cell progenitors and alteration of keratin expression. Radiation therapy has been associated with increased mucin production in hair follicles.

Studies have suggested electromagnetic radiation as a therapeutic growth stimulant in alopecia.

== Cosmeses ==
There have been advances in the fashion industry in wig design.

Certain hair shampoos and ointments visually thicken existing hair, without affecting the growth cycle. There have also been developments in the fashion industry with wig design. The fashion accessory has also been shown to be a source of psychological support for women undergoing chemotherapy, with cancer survivors in one study describing their wig as a "constant companion". Other studies in women have demonstrated a more mixed psychosocial impact of hairpiece use.

Specialized tattoos, commonly known as scalp micropigmentation, can mimic the appearance of a short buzzed haircut.

== Human hair growth ==
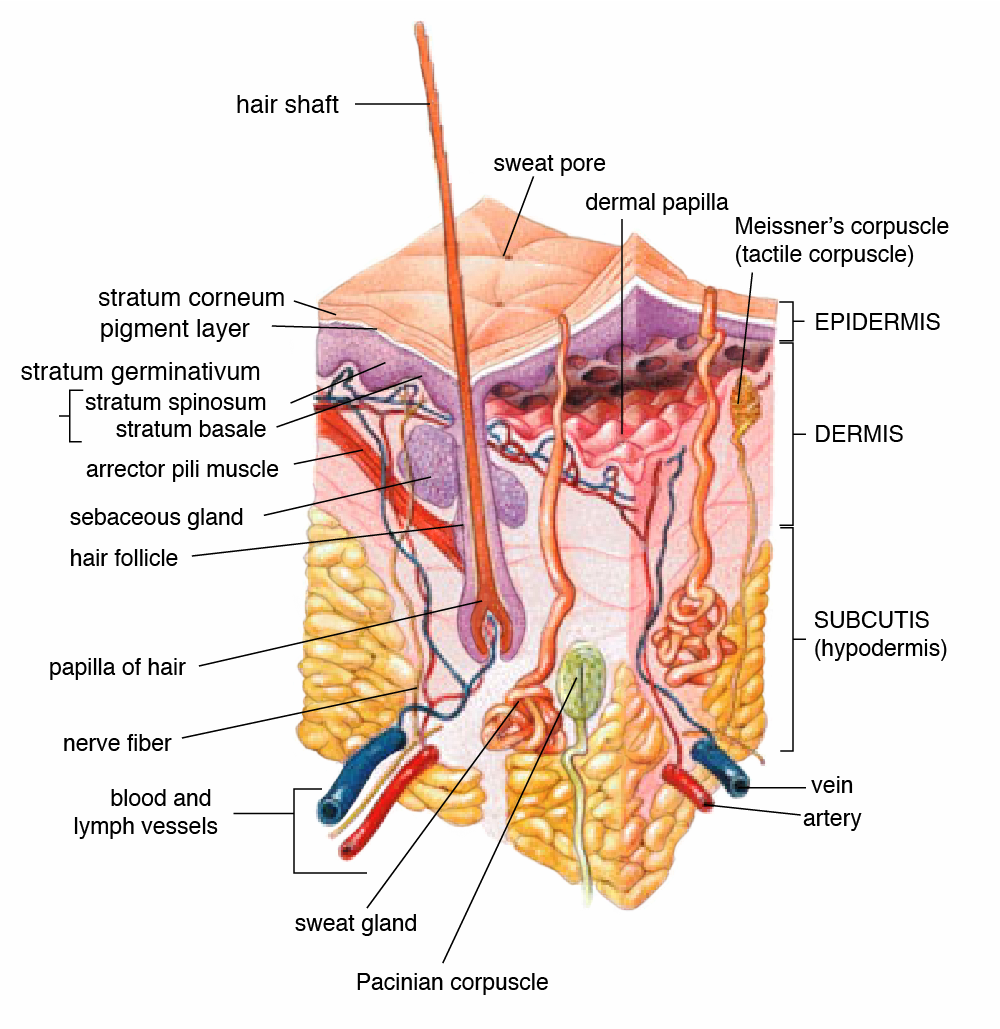
Hair follicle with mesenchymal dermal papilla, labelled at top, location of hair follicle stem cells and thought to be site of action of DHT.

Type 1 and 2 5α reductase enzymes are present at pilosebaceous units in papillae of individual hair follicles. They catalyse formation of the androgens testosterone and DHT, which in turn regulate hair growth. Androgens have different effects at different follicles: they stimulate IGF-1 at facial hair, causing hair regrowth, but stimulate TGF β1, TGF β2, dickkopf1 and IL-6 at the scalp, causing hair follicle miniaturisation.

Female androgenic alopecia is characterized by diffuse crown thinning without hairline recession, and like its male counterpart rarely leads to total hair loss. Finasteride and minoxidil are usually first line therapy for its treatment. Other options include topical or systemic spironolactone or flutamide, although they have a high incidence of feminising side effects and are better tolerated in female androgenic hair loss.

More advanced cases may be resistant or unresponsive to medical therapy, however, and require hair transplantation. Naturally occurring units of one to four hairs, called follicular units, are excised and moved to areas of hair restoration. These follicular units are surgically implanted in the scalp in close proximity and in large numbers. The grafts are obtained from either Follicular Unit Transplantation (FUT) – colloquially referred to as "strip harvesting" – or Follicular Unit Extraction (FUE). In the former, a strip of skin with follicular units is extracted and dissected into individual follicular unit grafts. The surgeon then implants the grafts into small incisions, called recipient sites. Specialized scalp tattoos can also mimic the appearance of a short buzzed haircut. Androgenic alopecia also occurs in women, and more often presents as diffuse thinning without hairline recession. Like its male counterpart, the condition rarely leads to total hair loss. Treatment options are similar to those for men, although topical or systemic estrogen is used more often.

== Research ==
=== Bimatoprost and latanoprost ===
Latanoprost and bimatoprost are specific PGF2a analogues applied topically, and have been found to lengthen eyelashes, darken hair pigmentation and elongate hair. Bimatoprost is available as treatment for eyelash growth. Latanoprost has shown ability to promote scalp hair density and pigmentation, and is theorized to function at the dermal papilla. A study found latanoprost ineffective on eyelashes in a patient with alopecia areata. It has also been found ineffective in treatment of eyebrow hair loss.

=== Hormones ===
Estrogens are indirect anti-androgens and can be used to treat androgenetic hair loss in women with oral contraceptives. Systemic estrogen increases SHBG, which binds androgens, including testosterone and DHT, in turn reducing their bioavailability. Topical formulations are available in Europe. Hair follicles have estrogen receptors and it is theorized that topical compounds act on them directly to promote hair growth and antagonize androgen action. Large clinical studies showing effectiveness are absent. Topical treatment is also usually unavailable in North America.

There is tentative evidence for cyproterone acetate in women.

=== IGF-1 ===
In December 2012, topical application of IGF-1 in a liposomal vehicle led to thicker and more rapid hair growth in transgenic mice with androgenic alopecia. The study did not show measurable systemic levels or hematopoietic side effects, suggesting potential for use in humans. Low energy radiofrequency irradiation induces IGF-1 in cultured human dermal papilla cells. Adenosine stimulates dermal papillae in vitro to induce IGF-1, along with fibroblast growth factors FGF7, FGF-2 and VEGF. β-catenin transcription increased, which promotes dermal papillae as well. Dietary isoflavones increase IGF production in scalp dermal papillae in transgenic mice. Topical capsaicin also stimulates IGF at hair follicles via release of vanilloid receptor-1, which in turn leads to more CGRP. Ascorbic acid has led to increased IGF expression in vitro.

=== Stem cell therapy ===
Although follicles were previously thought gone in areas of complete baldness, they are more likely dormant, as recent studies have shown the scalp contains the stem cells from which the follicles arose. Research on these follicular stem cells may lead to successes in treating baldness through hair multiplication (HM), also known as hair cloning.

Per a May 2015 review, no successful strategy to generate human hair follicles, for hair regrowth, from adult stem cells has yet been reported. However, in April 2016, scientists from Japan published results of their work in which they created human skin from induced pluripotent stem cells; implanted into laboratory mice, the cells generated skin with hair and glands.

=== Genetics ===
From 2005 to 2007, Curis and Procter & Gamble collaborated on developing a topical hedgehog agonist for hair loss; the agent did not meet safety standards, and the program was terminated. In 2008, researchers at the University of Bonn announced they have found the genetic basis of two distinct forms of inherited hair loss. They found the gene P2RY5 causes a rare, inherited form of hair loss called hypotrichosis simplex. It is the first receptor in humans known to play a role in hair growth. Researchers found that disruption of the gene SOX21 in mice caused cyclical hair loss. Research has suggested SOX21 as a master regulator of hair shaft cuticle differentiation, with its disruption causing cyclical alopecia in mice models. Deletion of SOX21 dramatically affects hair lipids.

== See also ==
- List of investigational hair loss drugs
