= Multiple follicular unit grafts =

Hair transplant technique

- Other names: Multi-follicular unit grafts; Multiple follicular unit transplantation
- Specialty: Dermatology, plastic surgery
- Uses: Restore hair by transplanting multiple follicular units simultaneously into recipient area
- Complications: Possibility of unnatural hair density; increased risk of graft failure if overcrowded; donor-site scarring
- Approach: Harvesting donor hair, dissection into multiple follicular units, implantation in designed pattern
- Types: Strip-based grafts; Partial grafts combining several follicular units; Modified techniques to preserve hair angle
- Recovery time: Weeks for donor area healing; months for visible hair growth; full density in ~8–12 months
- Other options: Single follicular unit grafts; follicular unit extraction; non-surgical cosmetic methods
- Frequency: Less common than single unit or FUE methods in many clinics
- Outcomes: Better graft yield per session; potentially denser coverage vs individual unit methods

Multiple follicular unit grafts is a hair transplant technique that has been developed to complement and enhance current micro grafting and follicular unit procedures by increasing density without sacrificing naturalness. A follicular unit (FU) is a naturally occurring bundle of hairs. This bundle contains anywhere from 1 to 4 hairs. A "multiple follicular unit" is a graft that contains more than one follicular unit. When combined these follicular units can total 5 to 8 hairs creating more significant results. These grafts are not to be mistaken with old style hair plugs harvested with a punch biopsy instrument, but instead are modern day slit grafts harvested from a thin donor strip in the back of the head and separated under magnification.

== History ==
Norman Orentreich, a dermatologist in New York City, is credited for popularizing the modern hair transplant of the 20th century. In 1952, he used a punch biopsy instrument to harvest large round 4 mm grafts from the donor area which were to be transplanted into punch graft sites in the patient's balding area. Although Dr. Orentreich's pioneering research advanced hair transplantation, the results were unnatural, "pluggy" and extremely sparse. In the 1980s, hair transplantation techniques improved when surgeons began to use much smaller grafts called minigrafts and micrografts which produced better, natural looking results.

Today's prevailing technique is a follicular unit transplant (FUT). Follicular unit transplants require the separation of follicles in their natural groupings. Under a microscope the hair in the donor area can be seen growing in patterns of 1, 2, 3 and 4 hairs. Most common are the 1, 2 and 3 hair groupings. Micrografts or single hair grafts are placed in the frontal hairline while FU Grafts containing 2 to 4 hairs are placed behind the hairline. Results with this technique are generally very natural but can lack density and require more than one surgery for satisfying results. For some doctors, using micrografts and follicular units only is not enough. Instead, they choose to use a mixture of micro grafts, FU grafts and “Multiple Follicular Unit Grafts”.

== Procedure ==
Using multiple follicular unit grafts behind the hairline which contain more than one naturally occurring follicular unit bundle, although still controversial, is becoming more widely accepted because of the proven natural results. Doctors combine micrografts, follicular units, and multi-FU's which results in 2-3 times the hair density of traditional hair transplant procedures. The advantage of this technique is that each graft contains more hair density, the hairs are more likely to be grouped in a natural pattern, the tissue is healthier because it is less likely to be damaged during separation and the actual surgery takes less time. The most impressive advantage is that the hair surgery achieves more satisfying results in just a single procedure.

== Risks and Side Effects ==
Post operative bleeding can occur in the first few days after surgery. There may be moderate swelling anywhere from 1 to 5 days. Temporary numbness can occur and in some rare cases can last for years. There may be temporary tightness in the suture line and/or scalp sensitivity.

== Cost ==
The cost of a hair transplant surgery using multiple follicular unit grafts can be significantly less than surgeries done with micro grafts and follicular units only. When using only FU grafts, there is a hidden cost because it will ultimately require more surgeries to achieve the same density as one surgery using multiple follicular unit grafts.
