= HairClub =

American hair restoration company

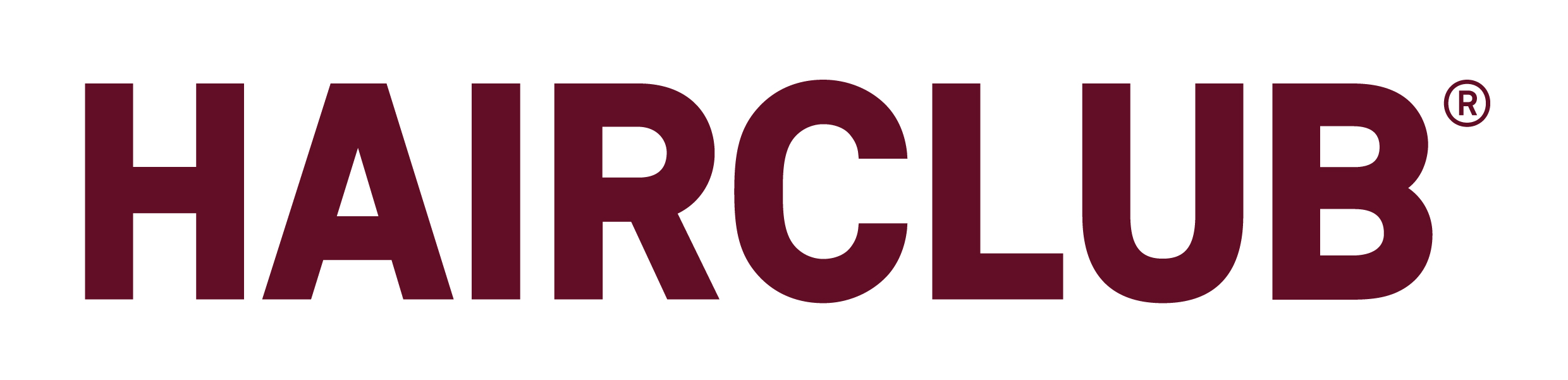
- Formerly: Hair Club for Men
- Industry: Hair restoration
- Founded: 1976
- Founder: Sy Sperling
- Headquarters: Boca Raton, Florida, United States

HairClub (formerly Hair Club for Men, also Hair Club for Men and Women) is an American hair restoration, hair regrowth, and hair replacement company headquartered in Boca Raton, Florida, with locations in the United States and Canada.

== History ==
HairClub was founded in 1976 by Seymour "Sy" Sperling (June 25, 1941 – February 19, 2020), who famously quipped "I'm not only the Hair Club president, but I'm also a client" in his TV commercials. For decades, Hair Club has advertised on television, airing several different commercials and infomercials. In 2004, Hair Club was purchased by Regis. In 2012, Regis then sold Hair Club to the Japanese hair restoration company Aderans.

On February 19, 2020, founder Sy Sperling died of an unspecified illness at a hospital in Boca Raton at age 78.

== Products ==
HairClub provides various hair restoration options including surgical hair replacement, non-surgical hair replacement, hair loss therapy and prevention for at-home use. The company originally offered services to male clientele only, but has long since added services for women to address female hair loss and thinning. Hair Club provides free hair restoration services to children with medical conditions that cause hair loss.
