= Prescriptives =

American cosmetics company

- Type: Subsidiary
- Industry: Cosmetics industry
- Founded: 1979; 47 years ago (original founding); 2011; 15 years ago (relaunch)
- Founder: Estée Lauder; Ronald Lauder; Sylvie Chantecaille
- Defunct: 2011; 15 years ago (original closing); 2019; 7 years ago (second closing)
- Headquarters: New York City, New York, United States
- Area served: Worldwide
- Products: Cosmetics, skincare, toiletries, fragrances
- Parent: Estée Lauder Companies
- Website: prescriptives.com

Prescriptives (often abbreviated as Px or PX) was an American manufacturer of cosmetics and skincare aimed at various international markets not limited to the United States. It is a subsidiary of Estée Lauder Companies and has been since its founding.

== History ==
Prior to its founding, Estée Lauder Companies had trouble attracting the younger generations of customers and was losing customers to brands like Ernő László and Lancôme. In response Estée Lauder and Ronald Lauder, conceptualized Prescriptives in 1977 and launched it in 1979 as a subsidiary of Estée Lauder Companies and brought in Sylvie Chantecaille to create and develop the brand. Prescriptives was the fourth brand that was formed from the Lauder Companies Group after its self titled brand, Estée Lauder, along with its other subsidiary brands Aramis and Clinique.

Prescriptives had previously focused on science based skincare innovation and artistry in order to appeal to the modern fashion-conscious career woman and the "Me Generation" and it did this by offering custom-blended foundations, powders and lipsticks to women by having makeup artists and sales reps literally mix raw pigments, moisturizers, or oil-absorbers right in front of the customer, being one of the first brands to do so. The brand would also use a technique called "color striping", also known as "colorprinting", using double-sided crayons, to analyze skin tones to determine if a customer had yellow, red, cool or warm undertones and would mix together personalized formulas for coverage, finish and moisture. Customers were also able to have stores save the recipes of the final products of their mixtures and allowed consumers to buy refillable compacts, snaps, and palettes in their choice of over 70 eyeshadow and blush pans. The brand was also one of the first brands to address glycation, offer a high-coverage foundation shade range to address various skin tones, and sell antioxidant serums like "Super Line Preventer". In 1986, the brand launched its first fragrance, named "Calyx", that had a scent of a crisp grapefruit-and-green floral fragrance which went on to be award-winning and widely successful. It was followed by customizable color cosmetics that expanded on the custom products that were made.

During the 2000s the brand experienced a decline in sales which was further exacerbated due to the lack of counter staff that were dedicated to the brand which served as a point of frustration from its customers and core fan base during the latter part of that decade. The brand was also struggling to attract both new and younger generations due rising competition from Bobbi Brown Cosmetics and MAC which had captured the youth market and department store spotlight. Younger generations were lured into the competition due to their preference for fast-moving color trends over meticulous customization, while Prescriptives stuck with its minimalist silver packaging and heavy scientific focus which failed to appeal to younger generations.

In September 2009, The Estée Lauder Companies announced the closure of the brand and the shutting down of its manufacturing and department store distribution, with CEO, Fabrizio Freda, stating that the brand's long-term business model was no longer viable. The shutdown process began in late 2009, with all remaining stock and products being distributed and the final manufacturing wrapping up the following year. All 750 physical wholesale department store counters were officially closed on January 31, 2010, but there was excess stock and inventory of the brand that continued to be sold. The excess stock and inventory of Prescriptives allowed the brand to be carried on until 2011, when the stock and inventory was finally all sold out. The closure resulted in an increased popular demand for product replenishments from loyal customers and its core fans, which then prompted The Estée Lauder Companies to relaunch the brand as an online-only e-commerce brand through its website in 2011. Estée Lauder even established a free 20-minute-video-chat service so that digital beauty experts can create the custom-made products remotely. This new arrangement lasted until 2019 when the e-commerce operation of Prescriptives was closed down, 40 years after the brand was first launched, with the brand ending with a brand "ahead of its time" legacy.

After the brand was shut down permanently, many of its unique and original formulations (such as "Calyx" and "Magic Powder") were eventually absorbed and sold under other Estée Lauder brands like Clinique, MAC and Smashbox. The "Calyx" fragrance, for example, remains a cult classic but is now sold under the Clinique brand due to Prescriptives shutting down. The Prescriptives Flawless Face Primer was moved over to the Estée Lauder Companies brand Smashbox. The brand's Virtual Match mechanism developed through their original Colorprinting technology and undertone matrix was brought back under both Estée Lauder iMatch in the Estée Lauder brand, as well as MAC. Former Prescriptives executive, Giella Poblocki, founded a luxury custom-blending brand called, Giella Custom Blend Cosmetics, to keep Prescriptives' custom blend concept alive with Estée Lauder Companies later backing the brand. Estée Lauder also brought back the custom blend concept in MAC and Estée Lauder as well.
