= Clinique =

American cosmetics company owned by Estée Lauder

Clinique Laboratories, LLC
- Type: Subsidiary
- Industry: Cosmetics industry
- Founded: 1968; 58 years ago
- Founder: Evelyn Lauder; Carol Phillips; Dr. Norman Orentreich
- Headquarters: New York City
- Area served: Worldwide
- Products: Cosmetics, skincare, toiletries, fragrances
- Parent: Estée Lauder Companies
- Subsidiaries: Clinique for Men
- Website: clinique.com

Clinique Laboratories, LLC (/klɪˈniːk/) is an American manufacturer of skincare, cosmetics, toiletries and fragrances, usually sold in high-end department stores. It is a subsidiary of the Estée Lauder Companies.

The brand began in 1968 at Saks Fifth Avenue as an allergy-tested, dermatologist-driven line, following a 1967 Vogue article by Carol Phillips and Norman Orentreich. Evelyn Lauder played a central role in developing the brand and its products. Its fragrances include Aromatics Elixir (1971) and Happy (1997).

== History ==
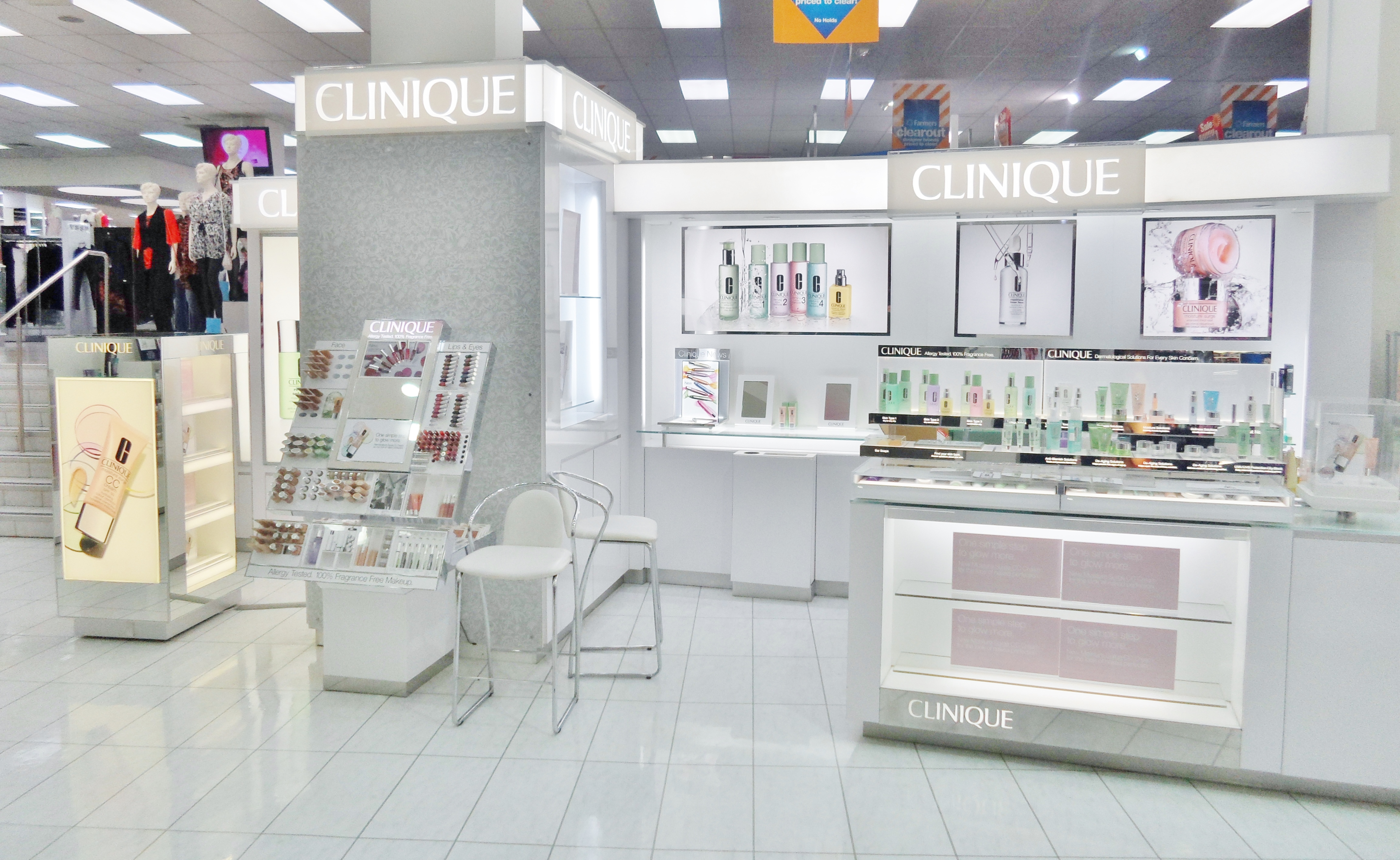
Clinique counter at a Farmers department store

=== Founding ===
In 1967, American Vogue magazine published an article called "Can Great Skin Be Created?", written by beauty editor Carol Phillips with Norman Orentreich, discussing the significance of a skin-care routine. Evelyn Lauder, daughter-in-law of Estée Lauder, read the article and brought it to Estée's attention. Both Carol Phillips and Orentreich were recruited to help create the brand, and in April 1968, Clinique premiered as the world's first allergy tested, dermatologist-driven line at Saks Fifth Avenue in New York, US, launched with 117 products. The brand launched with a 3-step routine for all skin types tailored for all outcomes looking to be achieved by a consumer while bringing a scientific approach to skincare.

=== Name and branding ===
Evelyn Lauder created the Clinique brand name and developed its line of products. Lauder worked as the training director for Clinique. She was the first person to wear the trademark white lab coat, now worn by Clinique Consultants worldwide. Evelyn Lauder chose the name "Clinique" after frequently seeing signs that said "Clinique Esthétiques" in a visit to Paris, France, where she observed that is where the locals would go to get facials and treatments. She thought that this name would provide for a fresh and clinical approach to skincare with an air of French glamour.

Clinique was the third brand that was "born" from the Lauder Group after Estée Lauder and Aramis.

=== Medical and research partnerships ===
In 2008, Clinique announced a partnership with Allergan, the maker of Botox and former cosmeceutical partner of Elizabeth Arden, which resulted in a new line called Clinique Medical. The line is only available in physician's offices. The five-product set is designed for pre- and post-operation skin care, and targets complications such as redness, tightness, burning, irritation, and discoloration, amongst others.

In 2024, Clinique formed a partnership with New York’s Icahn School of Medicine at Mount Sinai to establish a research dermatology center.

== Products ==
=== Fragrances ===
In 1971, Clinique debuted its first fragrance, named Aromatics Elixir, which celebrated its 40th anniversary in 2011 and went on to become one of the brand's signature fragrances. The brand's best selling fragrance, named Happy, was introduced in 1997. In 2013, the fragrance Calyx, originally from Clinique's sister brand Prescriptives, was re-released by Clinique after the Estée Lauder Companies folded the fragrance into Clinique, due to the Prescriptives brand shutting down and being restructured into an online only store.

=== Makeup ===
In 2021, the "Black Honey" shade from Clinique's "Almost Lipstick" line had a surge in popularity after going viral on social media, which then prompted the brand to expand the "Black Honey" shade into other lines in the brand with lip oil and eyeshadow shades in 2024. The brand also added the "Black Honey" shade to lip liner roster in January 2026.

== Marketing ==
In January 2020, Emilia Clarke became the brand ambassador of Clinique.

In 2022, Clinique launched in the Metaverse and released a new NFT campaign.

In March 2026, Clinique launched its first "creator-led" campaign in the brand's over 57-year long history, dubbed "Unstoppable Together", which marked the next evolution of the brand's approach to ambassadors at the time. The "Unstoppable Together" campaign is represented by gold medalists couple Tara Davis-Woodhall and Hunter Woodhall.
