= Mr. Bad Example (song) =

Single by Warren Zevon

from the album Mr. Bad Example
- Released: 1991
- Genre: Rock
- Length: 3:21
- Label: Giant
- Songwriter(s): Warren Zevon, Jorge Calderón.

"Mr. Bad Example" is a song composed in 1991 by Warren Zevon and Jorge Calderón. It was used as the title track for the album, Mr. Bad Example. It tells the story of a nameless con-man and thief, sung to a polka.

It has been described as "a hilarious shaggy dog tale of one man's love affair with global irresponsibility", and an "antiheroic credo". In the song, the narrator successfully steals from a church, customers of his father's carpet store, and even a prostitute he hired. He also has a brief stint as a lawyer, makes a fortune in hair replacement then squanders it playing chemin-de-fer, and successfully tricks and impoverishes aboriginals he had hired to mine for opal. The song ends with the man retiring from his dirty deals, and asking that when you meet him in the next life you wake him up for meals.
