= Human hair growth =

Process through which human hair grows

The growth of human hair occurs everywhere on the external body except for the soles of the feet, the palms of the hands, the lips, the backs of the ears, some external genital areas, the navel, and, apart from eyelashes, the eyelids. Hair is a stratified squamous keratinized epithelium made of multi-layered flat cells whose rope-like filaments provide structure and strength to the hair shaft. The protein keratin makes up hair and stimulates hair growth. Hair follows a specific growth cycle with three distinct and concurrent phases: anagen, catagen, and telogen. Each phase has specific characteristics that determine the length of the hair.

The body has different types of hair, including vellus hair and androgenic hair, each with its own type of cellular construction. This varied construction gives the hair unique characteristics, serving specific purposes, mainly warmth (redundant in modern humans) and physical protection. Most humans develop the longest thickest hair on their scalps and (mostly observed in males) faces. This hair will usually grow to several feet, but some humans develop much longer hair.

== Growth cycle ==
Hair-follicle cycling

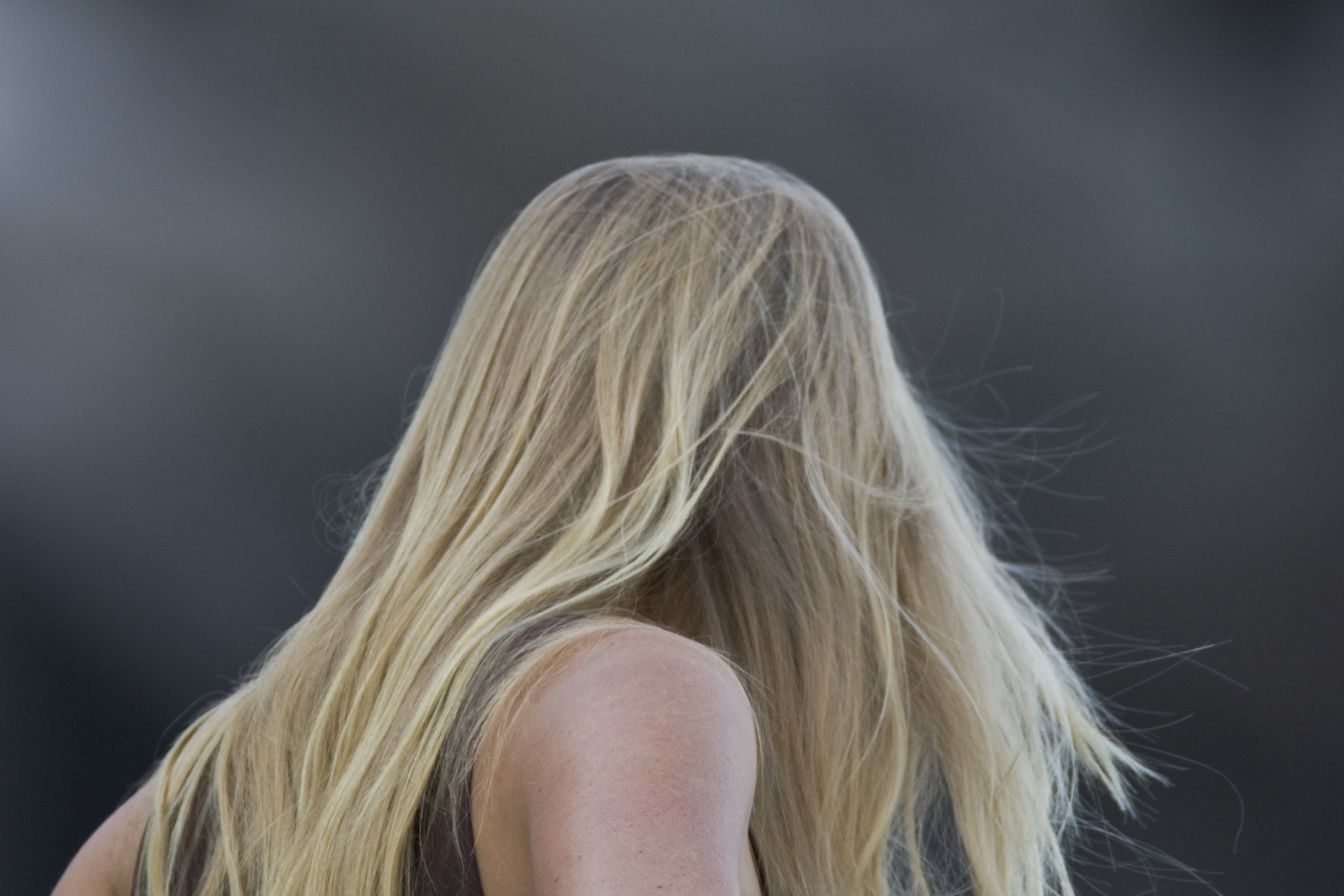
Hair grows at different speeds and different lengths. Its composition causes different colors and textures, which influence how long the hair strands grow.

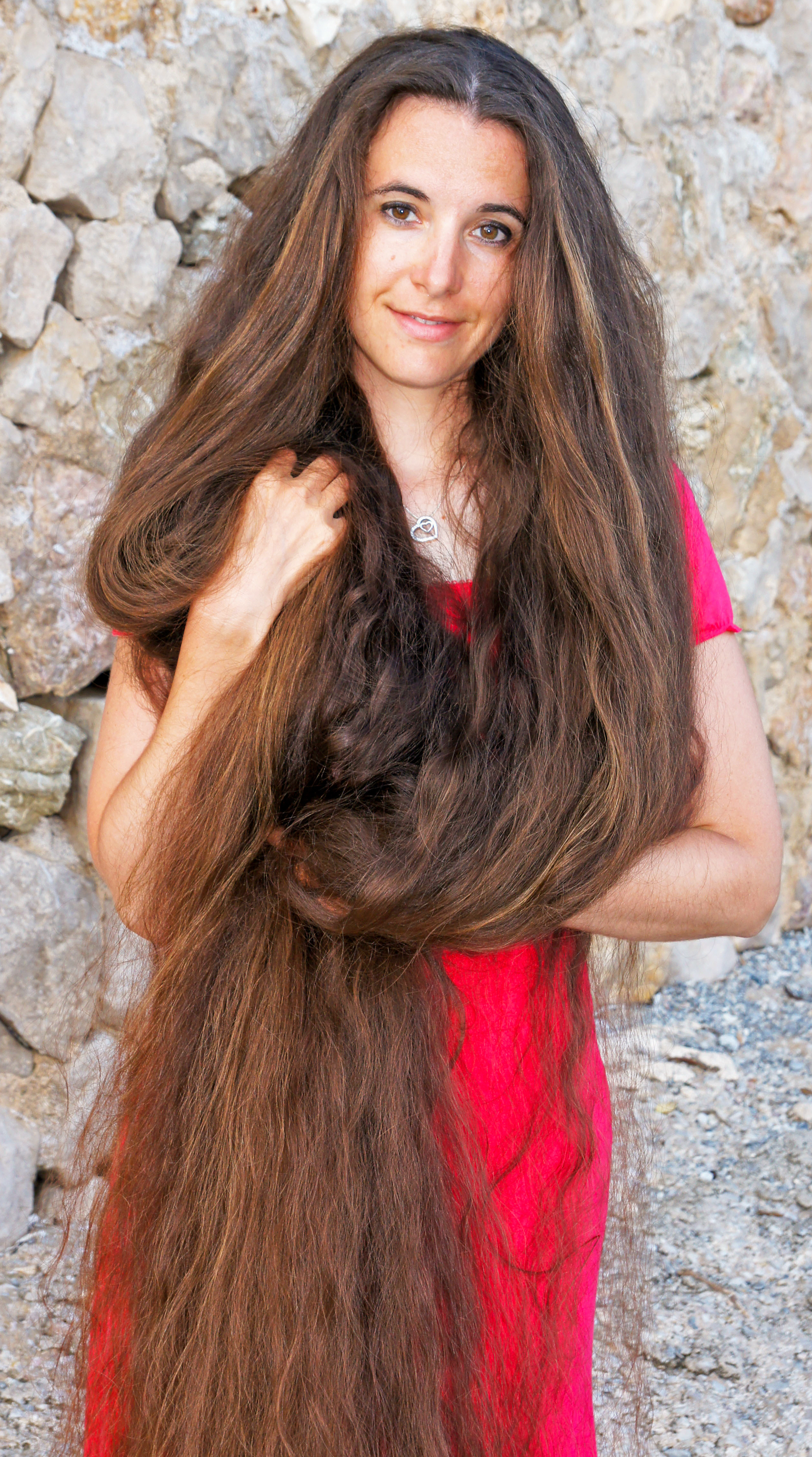
Marianne Ernst, a German "long hair model"

The three stages of hair growth are the anagen, catagen, and telogen phases. Each strand of hair on the human body is at its own stage of development. Once the cycle is complete, it restarts and a new strand of hair begins to form. The growth rate of hair varies from individual to individual depending on their age, genetic predisposition and a number of environmental factors. It is commonly stated that hair grows about 1 cm per month on average; however reality is more complex, since not all hair grows at once. Scalp hair was reported to grow between 0.6 cm and 3.36 cm per month. The growth rate of scalp hair somewhat depends on age (hair tends to grow more slowly with age), sex, and ethnicity. Thicker hair (>60 μm) grows generally faster (11.4 mm per month) than thinner (20–30 μm) hair (7.6 mm per month).

It was previously thought that Western European hair grew faster than Asian hair and that women's grew faster than men's; but newer research shows that the sexes do not differ significantly in speed of hair growth and that the hair of Chinese people grows faster than that of people living in France (both Caucasian and African). The quantity of hairs depends on hair colour (before graying): an average blond-haired person has 150,000 hairs, a brown-haired person has 110,000, a black-haired person has 100,000, and a redhead has 90,000. Hair growth stops at death; the illusion of growth after death is due to shrinkage of the skin by drying.

=== Anagen phase ===
The anagen phase, known as the growth phase, is when the hair grows about 1 cm per month. It begins in the papilla and can last from three to five years. The span at which the hair remains in this stage of growth is determined by genetics. The longer the hair stays in the anagen phase, the longer it will grow. During this phase, cells neighboring the papilla in a germinative layer divide to produce new hair fibers, and the follicle buries itself into the dermal layer of the skin to nourish the strand. About 85%–90% of the hairs on one's head are in the anagen phase at any given time.

=== Catagen phase ===
The catagen phase, or the transitional phase, allows the follicle to renew itself (in a sense). During this time, which lasts about two weeks, the hair follicle shrinks due to disintegration and the papilla detaches and "rests," cutting the hair strand off from its nourishing blood supply. Signals sent out by the body (that only selectively affect 1 percent of all hair of one's body at any given time) determine the end of melanin production in the hair bulb and apoptosis of follicular melanocytes. Ultimately, the follicle is 1/6 its original length, causing the hair shaft to be pushed upward.

=== Telogen phase ===
The telogen (resting) phase of the hair follicle lasts about three months. The final product of a hair follicle in the telogen stage is a dead, fully keratinized hair (a "club hair"). A normal scalp sheds 50-100 such hairs per day. When the body is subjected to extreme stress, as much as 70% of hair can enter the telogen phase at the same time and begin to fall out ("telogen effluvium").

== Growth inhibitors and disorders ==
In most people, scalp hair growth will halt due to follicle devitalization after reaching a length of generally two or three feet (60–90 cm). Exceptions to this rule can be observed in individuals with hair development abnormalities, which may cause an unusual length of hair growth.

=== Chemotherapy ===
Most chemotherapy drugs work by attacking rapidly dividing cells. Rapid cell replication is one of the hallmarks of cancer; however, hair follicle cells also grow and divide quickly. Consequently, the chemotherapy drugs usually inhibit hair growth. The dose and type of medicine will determine the severity of hair loss. Once the course of chemotherapy has ended, new hair growth may begin after three to ten weeks.

=== Hair loss ===
Alopecia is a hair loss disease that can occur in anyone at any stage of life. Specifically alopecia areata is an autoimmune disease that causes hair to spontaneously fall out. It is mainly characterized by bald patches on the scalp or other parts of the body, and can ultimately cause baldness across the entire body. This disease interferes with the hair growth cycle by causing a follicle to prematurely leave the anagen, or active growth, phase and enter the resting, or telogen, phase. The hair growth in the affected follicles is lessened or stopped completely. Primary Cicatricial Alopecias (PCAs), commonly referred to as scarring alopecias, are a collective group of inflammatory disorders with distinctive pathological features that include the development of fibrosis, permanent destruction of the pilosebaceous unit of the hair follicle (HF), and irreversible hair loss.

Traction alopecia is caused by imposing too much strain on the hair on the head. Tight ponytails and other styles that require added tension to the hair can cause this disease. It can also occur on the face in areas where the hair is often styled. Plucking or waxing eyebrows frequently, for example, can lead to suppressed hair growth in the area.

On the scalp, the hair is usually known to be lost around the hair line, leaving the densest amount of hair at the crown. Small vellus hair will often replace the hair that is lost.

=== Radiation therapy to the head ===
Human hair follicles are quite sensitive to the effects of radiation therapy administered to the head, which is most commonly used to treat cancerous growths within the brain. Hair shedding may start as soon as two weeks after the first dose of radiation and will continue for a couple of weeks. Hair follicles typically enter the telogen phase, and regrowth should commence 2.5 to 3 months after the hair begins to shed. Regrowth may be sparser after treatment.

=== UV-B ===
Ultraviolet light levels of either 20 or 50 mJ/cm^{−2} in the UV-B range have been shown to inhibit hair growth, reduce hair melanin and damage hair follicles.

== See also ==
- Evolution of hair
- Hair transplantation
- Hair cloning
