= Laxometer =

Measuring device for scalp skin mobility

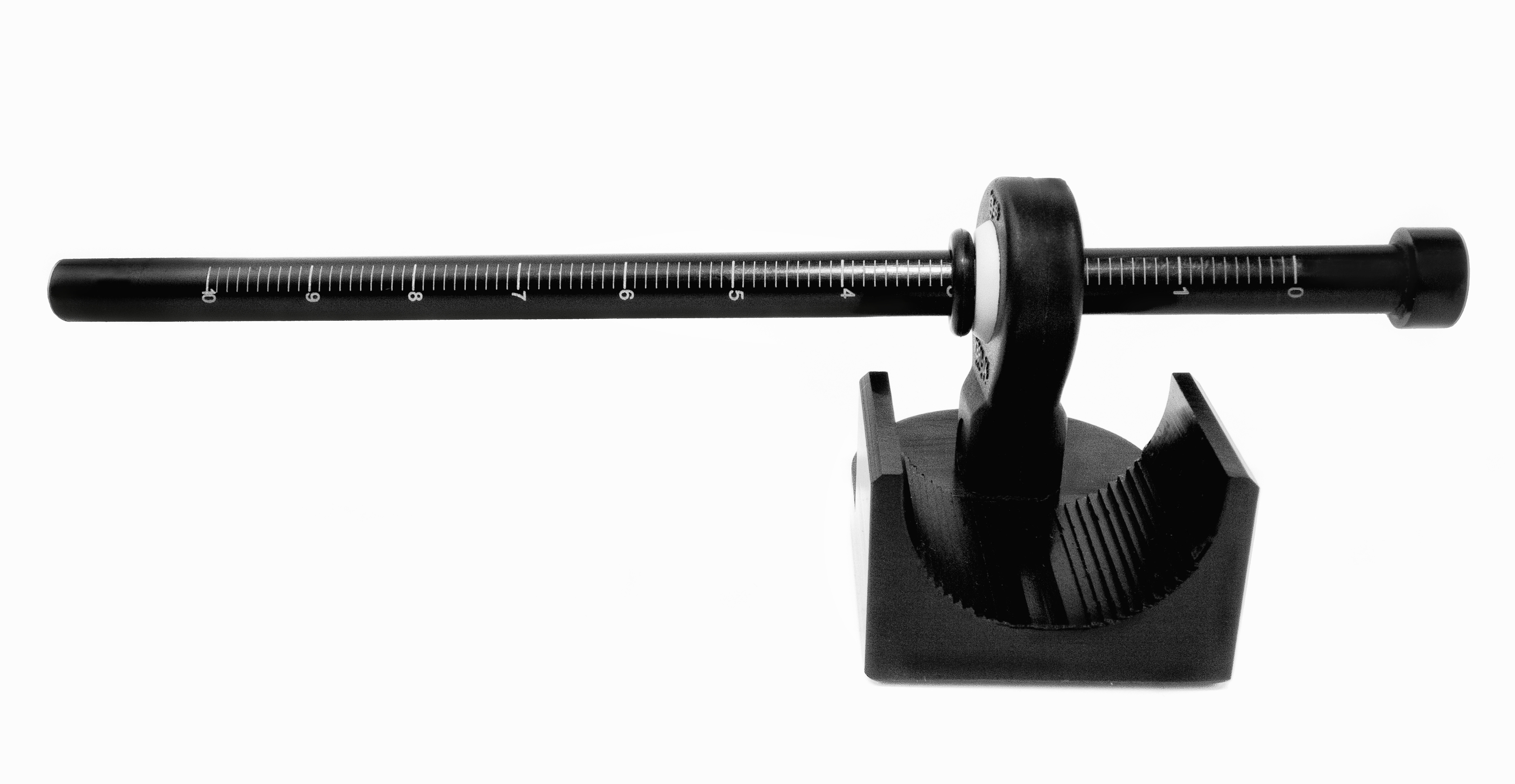
Laxometer

A laxometer is a measuring device for scalp skin mobility (or more specifically, laxity) used in hair restoration surgery, where a strip of skin from a donor area on the back of the scalp is transplanted. A laxometer measures this by seeing how much the skin can stretch vertically when pinched by the laxometer.

== History ==
The laxometer was first presented at the 15th Annual Meeting of the International Society of Hair Restoration Surgery in Las Vegas. It was invented by Parsa Mohebi, M.D. and introduced as the first tool that could objectively measure the laxity of scalp in hair transplant patients. Special laxometers have also been designed for shoulders in addition to the scalp. One issue with laxometers at the time is that they were not always accurate to measuring ideal properties as the measurement is influenced by a combination of subcutaneous fat, as well as the thickness and stiffness of skin. A scalp laxometer design was proposed in 2011 which was designed to improve on these reported inaccuracies.

== Application ==
A laxometer determines the laxity or looseness of the scalp. This information reduces the risk of donor complications when a surgeon cannot easily close the donor wound after removing the strip of skin from the donor area. This is relevant for those patients who have a high demand for hair and scarce resources.

There are two types of laxometer:

1. A clinical laxometer can be used during a clinic visit. Clinical laxometers are non-invasive and easy to use in assessing patients’ scalp laxity in pre-op evaluation or following the improvement of scalp laxity after a period of scalp exercise.
2. An intra-operative laxometer is more precise and is used during hair transplant surgery right before removing the strip. Having a more precise measurement of scalp laxity can significantly reduce the chance of removing too much skin, which can make closure of the donor wound difficult.
