= Disciplining gendered bodies =

Gendered bodies conformance

Disciplining gendered bodies is the practice of conforming one's body to society's standards and expectations.

There are various visible ways in which people and cultures consciously and unconsciously maintain binary heteronormative norms, which involve choices of female or male gender actions and performances. Common body practices, or gestures, are combined with gender expectations that make it hard to recognize these practices. Three examples of heteronormative disciplines are gendered attractiveness, embodied space, and body movement.

== Gendered attractiveness ==
Gendered attractiveness is the physical appearance of a male or female that is considered ideal, beautiful, attractive and having sex appeal of oneself or others. Males, for example, should be large in stature, muscular, full head of hair, straight white teeth, healthy and alluring to look at. They spend many hours trying to perfect their bodies with physical exercise. They also make changes to their appearance with hair removal, hair plugs, teeth veneers and body tanning. Males want to be seen as strong, dominant and masculine.

Females, on the other hand, should be slender, tall, have long blonde hair, perfect skin and Barbie doll-like features. Females want to be characterized as petite, skinny and fit. The problem is that "tall" and "petite" are opposites. Females are concerned about how they look, what they wear and they desire to be attractive, and thus go to great lengths to make sure that they feel and look attractive and polished. Females make permanent changes to their bodies as they have cosmetic surgery on all areas of their bodies such as, nose, face, lips, chin, teeth, breast, buttock, feet and many other parts of the body. Females also make temporary changes such as cut and color hair, tanning for darker skin color, hair removal from body, paint finger and toe nails. In addition, females use clothes, shoes and accessories such as scarfs, jewelry, purses and eyeglasses to help make them feel and look attractive.

== Embodied space ==
Embodied space is the way males and females familiarize with their bodies in their surroundings and often compare to each other. The area of personal and interpersonal space tends to be diverse and has various levels for different genders and how it is used to disciple one's self and others. Males and females also experience their bodies in different ways such as females are more guarded in the way they experience their bodies than males who are less guarded. The size of personal space also had to do with gender. Females compared to males take up less space and males tend to spread out. An example would be when a female sits in a chair they normally sit straight up with legs crossed and when male sits in the chair they sprawl out and legs are spread.

== Body movement ==
Body movement is how one moves their bodies or how someone's attitude or manners help to express how one carries themselves. Each gender has specific flow or body movements that are normal for them. Females experience their bodies in more guarded way, how to hamper their movement and do not bring their whole bodies into motion. Females are told how to sit, stand and walk properly. Females are more nonverbal and tend to use more facial expressions and more body movement than males. Males are taught to use and abuse their bodies and put their bodies into an aggressive motion. Males have more expansive movements and show higher levels of activity than females.
