= LPAR6 =

Protein-coding gene in the species Homo sapiens

Identifiers
- Aliases: LPAR6, ARWH1, HYPT8, LAH3, P2RY5, P2Y5, lysophosphatidic acid receptor 6, LPA-6
- External IDs: OMIM: 609239; MGI: 1914418; GeneCards: LPAR6

Gene location (Human)
Chr.	Chromosome 13 (human)
Band	13q14.2	Start	48,389,567 bp
Band	13q14.2	End	48,444,704 bp

Gene location (Mouse)
Chr.	Chromosome 14 (mouse)
Band	14|14 D3	Start	73,475,335 bp
Band	14|14 D3	End	73,480,734 bp
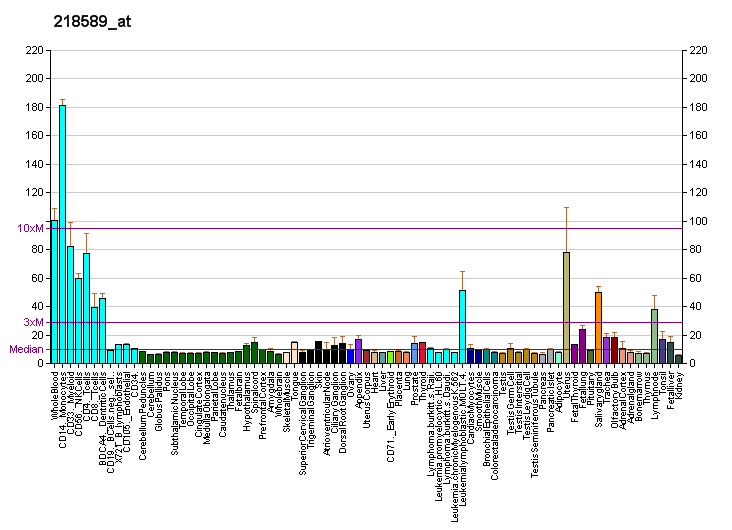
RNA expression pattern
Bgee	Human / Mouse (ortholog); Top expressed in: gingival epithelium; monocyte; skin of hip; minor salivary glands; oral cavity; vagina; granulocyte; olfactory zone of nasal mucosa; Achilles tendon; gallbladder / Top expressed in: hand; hair follicle; brown adipose tissue; medullary collecting duct; mammary gland; otolith organ; utricle; skin of abdomen; mandibular prominence; maxillary prominence; More reference expression data
BioGPS	More reference expression data
Gene ontology
Molecular function	G protein-coupled receptor activity; signal transducer activity; lysophosphatidic acid receptor activity
Cellular component	integral component of membrane; plasma membrane; membrane; integral component of plasma membrane; intracellular membrane-bounded organelle
Biological process	signal transduction; positive regulation of Rho protein signal transduction; positive regulation of cytosolic calcium ion concentration involved in phospholipase C-activating G protein-coupled signaling pathway; G protein-coupled receptor signaling pathway; blastocyst hatching
Sources:Amigo / QuickGO
Orthologs
Databases	NCBI: entry; OMA: entry
Species	Human	Mouse
Entrez	10161	67168
Ensembl	ENSG00000139679	ENSMUSG00000033446
UniProt	P43657	Q8BMC0
RefSeq (mRNA)	NM_005767; NM_001162497; NM_001162498; NM_001377316; NM_001377317	NM_175116
RefSeq (protein)	NP_001155969; NP_001155970; NP_005758; NP_001364245; NP_001364246	NP_780325
Location (UCSC)	Chr 13: 48.39 – 48.44 Mb	Chr 14: 73.48 – 73.48 Mb
PubMed search
- Wikidata
View/Edit Human	View/Edit Mouse

Lysophosphatidic acid receptor 6, also known as LPA_{6} and P2RY5, is a protein that in humans is encoded by the LPAR6 gene. LPA_{6} is a G protein-coupled receptor that binds the lipid signaling molecule lysophosphatidic acid (LPA).

The protein encoded by this gene belongs to the family of G-protein coupled receptors, that are preferentially activated by adenosine and uridine nucleotides. This gene aligns with an internal intron of the retinoblastoma susceptibility gene in the reverse orientation.

== Role in hair growth/loss ==
In February 2008, researchers at the University of Bonn announced they have found the genetic basis of two distinct forms of inherited hair loss, opening a broad path to treatments for baldness. They found that mutations in the gene P2RY5 causes a rare, inherited form of hair loss called hypotrichosis simplex. It is the first receptor in humans known to play a role in hair growth. The fact that any receptor plays a specific role in hair growth was previously unknown to scientists, and with this new knowledge a focus on finding more of these genes may be able to lead to therapies for many different types of hair loss.

In 2013, it was found that mutations in LPAR6 give rise to the Cornish Rex cat breed, which has a form of ectodermal dysplasia characterised by short woolly hair which is susceptible to loss.

== See also ==
- Lysophospholipid receptor
- P2Y receptor
