= Norman Orentreich =

American dermatologist (1922–2019)

- Born: December 26, 1922; New York City, U.S.
- Died: January 23, 2019 (aged 96); New York City, U.S.
- Education: CUNY, New York University
- Known for: Seminal contributions to hair transplantation and Cosmetic Dermatology
- Scientific career
- Fields: Dermatologist
- Workplaces: New York University, The Orentreich Medical Group, The Orentreich Foundation for the Advancement of Science

Norman Orentreich (/ˈɒrəntraɪk/; December 26, 1922 – January 23, 2019) was a New York dermatologist, a biogerontologist, a foundational innovator in cosmetics, and the father of hair transplantation.

Orentreich created Estée Lauder Companies' Clinique line of skin care products, invented a number of dermatologic procedures and was the first president of the American Society for Dermatologic Surgery. He is the founder of the Orentreich Medical Group and the Orentreich Foundation for the Advancement of Science, and the co-director of the latter organization.

== Hair transplantation ==
The New York Academy of Medicine cited Orentreich's early research, as a young man, as being critical to later developments in hair transplantation:

While at NYU’s Skin and Cancer hospital, Norman focused his clinical research on patients with hair loss, making use of small scalp skin grafts to better understand the pathophysiology of these diverse conditions. This led to the establishment of the theory of donor and recipient dominance, making it surgically possible to transplant healthy “androgen insensitive” hair from the back of the scalp to the “androgen sensitive” bald areas in the front where it would take and grow permanently.

In 1952, Orentreich, having graduated from New York University School of Medicine in 1948, performed the first modern, and successful, hair transplants in his office in New York. By 1961, Orentreich had performed transplants on approximately 200 patients. By 1966, approximately 10,000 men over the world had undergone the treatment invented by Orentreich.

According to the textbook Hair Transplantation, edited by Walter P. Unger, M.D. and Ronald Shapiro, M.D.:

As at one time all roads led to Rome, no discussion of the origins of hair transplantation, as a treatment for MPB (Male Pattern Baldness) or of any of the men who first practiced this technique can begin without homage to this extraordinary clinician and scientist who gladly -- and from the beginning -- shared his knowledge with colleagues all over the world... The true "fathers" of hair restoration for MPB (male pattern baldness) all emerged as a result of collaboration or friendship with Dr. Orentreich.

In the process of performing hair transplants, Orentreich discovered that "hair maintained the characteristics of the area from which it comes (the hair-bearing donor area), rather than to the area in which it is transplanted (the bald recipient area)," he coined this principle donor dominance.

Orentreich's hair transplant method was referred as the "cookie cutter" method, as the medical technique of cutting out pieces of haired skin resembles the act of cutting cookie dough with a cookie cutter.

== Clinique ==
In 1968, Orentreich was the expert interviewed for an article in Vogue by Carol Philips titled Can Great Skin Be Created? Orentreich had pioneered a skin care regimen based on sequential cleansing, exfoliation, and moisturizing that became the focus of the Clinique line and is widespread in skin care today. In August of that year, Estée Lauder recruited Philips and Orentreich and Clinique was launched with foundational products designed by Orentreaich. Clinique's promotional materials highlight Orentreich's influence on the brand's ethos:

Dr Norman Orentreich holds that human skin is intuitively capable of renewing itself, although this capability weakens with the passage of age and environmental conditions. He believes that great skin can be created if the secrets of the natural skin development are unlocked.

Orentreich worked with Clinique as one of the brand's "Guiding Dermatologists," as did two of his children, Dr. David Orentreich and Dr. Catherine Orentreich. According to a 2011 market study by the NPD Group, "Clinique was the best-selling skin-care brand in United States department stores; [...] the Estée Lauder brand came in second" in 2010.

In 1986, he was among the group of dermatologists who heavily criticized the Glycel ad where the famous South African surgeon Christiaan Barnard promoted the "miracle cream" despite a complete lack of scientific study to back up any of the brand's claims.

== Sued ==
The New York Times, (October 7.,1977), reported that singer Kitty Kallen had sued Orientreich, who had prescribed an estrogen drug, Premarin, for her small facial wrinkles. She subsequently suffered blood clots in her lungs, caused directly by the drug. She was awarded $300,000 at trial.

== Biology of Aging and The Orentreich Foundation for the Advancement of Science ==
As an undergraduate student, Orentreaich learned of experiments done by Nobel laureate Alexis Carrell that showed that the rate of wound healing declined with age, and that the rate of cell proliferation in tissue culture could be increased by the addition of blood serum from younger donors or decreased using serum from older donors.

In 1961, Orentreich founded the Orentreich Foundation for the Advancement of Science (OFAS), a biomedical research organization. OFAS has done work on the biology of aging, cancer and dermatology. One of his first experiments there was to replicate Carrell's result. He was optimistic for hormone replacement therapy as a means to retard the aging process, and studied th potential role of "metabolic toxins" such as soluble tumor necrosis factor receptor 2 in aging, the role of glucose metabolism in Alzheimer's disease, as well as hyperinsulinemia, methionine restriction, and autoimmune diseases of the skin in aging.

Beginning in 1964, a group of members of the Kaiser Permanente integrated care delivery system in the northern California region participated in a program conducted by Kaiser Permanente that involved broad-spectrum physical examinations, including blood testing. Kaiser Permanente continued to maintain a portion of the blood serum specimens for use in future health research. Starting in 1980 and continuing until 2012, OFAS contributed the resources and services that were required to retain and maintain the KP-OFAS Serum Repository. In particular, OFAS validated the chemical integrity of the retained serum and catalogued the specimens and their coded data in a computer database so they could be retrieved efficiently and used productively in health research studies.

In celebration of the bicentennial of the United States, the Orentreich foundation was called upon to study hairs belonging to President George Washington to determine the blood type of America's first president. After seeking out the assistance and expertise of Dr. M. Mitsuo Yokoyama it was determined that Washington had B type blood.

== Publications ==
- Orentreich, Norman; Jules, Markofsky; Joseph H., Vogelman (July 1979). "The Effect of Aging on the Rate of Linear Nail Growth". Journal of Investigative Dermatology. Vol. 73, no. 1. pp. 126–130.
