= Follicular unit extraction =

Method of obtaining human hair follicles

Follicular unit extraction (FUE; also follicular unit excision or follicular transfer, FT) involves the harvesting, performed under local anaesthetic, of individual hair follicles from the donor site at the back of the head using a tiny 0.8 - 1mm punch which creates an incision around the top of the follicle and extracts them directly from the scalp. The FUE method allows the surgeon to complete the procedure without leaving any linear scarring. It is one of two primary methods of obtaining hair follicles, naturally occurring groups of one to four hairs, for hair transplantation. The other method is called strip harvesting. In 2018, Mejia published the updated guidelines adopted by the International Society of Hair Restoration Surgery. This name change came about to accurately describe the procedure, which involves surgically cutting or incising a full thickness hair follicle skin graft with a circular scalpel, punch or motorized drill and subsequently carefully extracting it from the scalp to be placed in the donor balding scalp. Due to the new developments of incision punches and devices and a variety of different extraction techniques, it was necessary to more accurately define the procedure. Additionally, many places were incorrectly marketing the extraction procedure as a simple plucking of hairs and deceiving the public.

The follicular units obtained by either method are the basic building blocks of follicular unit transplantation (FUT).

Follicular unit extraction was first described in 1988 by Masumi Inaba in Japan, who introduced the use of a 1 mm needle for extracting follicular units.

Follicular unit excision takes considerable time and expense to learn and to develop skills to a high standard. The first part of the procedure involves making an incision with a circular cutting punch around the hair follicle through the epidermis into the subcutaneous tissue in order to release the follicle from the underlying tissue. The hair follicle grouping or follicular unit is a full thickness skin graft containing epidermis, dermis and fat. The graft is then subsequently extracted utilizing suction, or forceps or specialized aid to extraction instruments (ATOE) and carefully preserved until it is time to reimplant into the donor scalp or recipient area. Each follicular unit is excised one at a time being very careful not to cut the underlying hair matrix cells and injure or fracture the graft with transection. Additional care must also be taken when extracting the grafts with forceps to insure the hair follicles are not crushed or manipulated too aggressively which could also affect the growth. Hence FUE requires careful attention to detail and time. Consequently, many physicians are not able to excise as many grafts in one day compared to traditional FUT due to the time involved.

The survival of follicular units upon cutting around the hair follicle and then extracting from the scalp is one of the key variables of successful hair transplantation. If follicular units are transected in the incision process, there is a greater likelihood that they will not survive the transplant, and the hair transplant will fail. While FUT procedures using strip-harvesting of follicular units typically guarantees a large number of non-transected follicular units, FUE procedures can, and often do, transect grafts, rendering them useless in a transplant.

FUE harvesting is a surgical technique of grafts and may cause "pit" scarring, small, round, and typically white scars in the patient's donor area where the grafts have been removed. However, thanks to changes in punches in recent years, graft transection rates have decreased significantly. Patients' skin type, hair structure and FU depth are the parameters used when determining punches. Punches can be used manually or motorized. In addition, thanks to oscillating machines, the FUE method can be performed without shaving the hairs. Follicular unit excision generally has a quicker patient recovery time and significantly lower post-operative discomfort than follicular unit transplantation (FUT). Additionally the risk of long term nerve damage, leading to chronic numbness and/or pain in the donor area, is significantly reduced with FUE vs the strip (FUT) procedure. Additionally, FUE provides an alternative to FUT when the scalp is too tight for a strip excision and enables a hair transplant surgeon to harvest finer hair from the nape of the neck to be used at the hairline or for eyebrows.

However, with FUE, the follicles are harvested from a much greater area of the donor zone compared to FUT, estimated to be eight times greater than that of traditional strip excision so requires patients to have hairs trimmed in a much larger donor area. Follicles excised from borderline areas of the donor region may not be truly "permanent," so that over time, the transplanted hair may be lost. Due to the scarring and distortion of the donor scalp from FUE it makes subsequent sessions more difficult, and grafts are more fragile and subject to trauma during placing, since they often lack the protective dermis and fat of microscopically dissected grafts.

== See also ==
- Hair cloning
- Hair loss
