= Follicular unit transplantation =

Hair loss treatment

- Specialty: Dermatology, plastic surgery
- Uses: Restore hair in bald or thinning areas using naturally occurring follicular units
- Complications: Linear donor-site scar; postoperative pain or discomfort; folliculitis; graft failure; temporary shock loss
- Approach: Strip harvesting of donor tissue; microscopic dissection; transplantation of 1–4 hair follicular units
- Types: Traditional strip FUT; variations in dissection/closure technique
- Recovery time: Days–weeks for donor healing; new hair growth ~3–4 months; full results ~8–12 months
- Other options: Follicular unit extraction; micro- or mini-grafting; non-surgical cosmetic methods
- Frequency: Historically common; less common since the rise of FUE
- Outcomes: Improved density and natural hairline when performed by experienced teams

Follicular unit transplantation (FUT) is a hair restoration technique, also known as the strip procedure, where a patient's hair is transplanted in naturally occurring groups of 1 to 4 hairs, called follicular units. Follicular units also contain sebaceous (oil) glands, nerves, a small muscle, and occasional fine vellus hairs. In follicular unit transplantation, these small units allow the surgeon to safely transplant thousands of grafts in a single session, which maximizes the cosmetic impact of the procedure. FUT is considered an advance over older hair transplantation procedures that used larger grafts and often produced a pluggy, unnatural look. In a properly performed follicular unit transplant, the results will mimic the way hair grows in nature and will be undetectable as a hair transplant.

In recent history, FUT had been the most common procedure for hair restoration. As of 2017, the newer follicular unit extraction (FUE) procedure has become the most common procedure.

== Key concepts ==
Follicular unit transplantation uses follicular units to accomplish a number of objectives critical to the hair restoration process:

=== Maximizing hair transplant growth ===
Since the follicular unit is a distinct anatomic and physiologic entity, preserving it intact during the graft dissection is felt to maximize growth. In FUT, after hair is removed from the back of the scalp in a single strip, stereo-microscopic dissection allows the individual follicular units to be removed from this strip without being damaged.

In the older mini-micrografting techniques, hair was harvested in multiple strips with the follicular units in each strip edge showing damage from the harvesting blades. The strips were then cut into smaller pieces, a process that would break up follicular units and risk additional damage to the follicles.

=== Ensuring the naturalness of hair transplant ===
Follicular Unit Transplantation enables the hair transplant to look natural both at the individual follicular unit level and in regards to the overall graft distribution. Since scalp hair normally grows in follicular units of 1 to 4 hairs, the exclusive use of these naturally occurring units in FUT ensures that each graft will be identical to the surrounding follicular units. Thus, when the transplanted follicular units grow hair after a transplant, the overall results of the transplant will appear natural.

Additionally, by using individual follicular units, rather than larger grafts, the surgeon has a greater total number of grafts with which to work. This allows the surgeon to distribute the grafts more evenly over the scalp for a more natural overall distribution of hair.

=== Ease of surgical planning ===
The density of naturally occurring follicular units in a normal scalp is relatively constant, measured at approximately 1 unit per mm^{2}. This helps in the planning of a hair transplant in two ways:

1. The hair transplant surgeon can accurately estimate the number of follicular grafts that can be obtained from dissecting a donor strip of a given size.
2. The same number of follicular units can be used to cover a specific size bald area regardless of the patient's actual hair density.

In patients with high hair density, there are usually a sufficient number of follicular units in the donor area to accomplish the patient's goals. However, in the patient with low hair density, a compromise must be made, and this is guided by the follicular unit constant. By transplanting a patient with low hair density using the same number and spacing of follicular units as in a patient with high density, the transplant surgeon will produce a thinner look, but will allow proper conservation of donor hair for future procedures.

=== Minimizing trauma to the scalp ===
The key to a natural appearing hair transplant is to have the hair emerge from perfectly normal skin, so minimizing trauma to the scalp is an important aspect of follicular unit transplantation. This can be accomplished by trimming away the excess tissue around the follicular units and then inserting them into small recipient sites on the patient's scalp.

Follicular units are relatively compact structures, but are surrounded by substantial amounts of non-hair bearing skin. This extra tissue can be removed without injuring the follicles, using stereo-microscopic dissection. These small, trimmed, follicular unit grafts can then be placed into tiny incisions in the patient's scalp; thereby minimizing damage to the scalp's connective tissue and blood supply. In contrast; the larger wounds produced by mini-micrografting and plug transplants caused cosmetic problems that included dimpling and pigment changes in the skin; depression or elevation of the grafts; and a thinned, shiny look to the scalp. These problems can be avoided using very small grafts and very small recipient wounds.

Another advantage of making small recipient wounds is the ability to create a "snug fit" for the follicular unit grafts. Unlike the punch grafts and some mini-grafting techniques; each of which removes a small bit of tissue in the recipient area; the trimmed follicular unit grafts used in FUT fit into small, needle-made incisions without any need for removing tissue. This preserves the elasticity of the scalp and holds the tiny grafts snugly in place. After surgery, the snug fit facilitates wound healing and helps to ensure that the grafts will get enough oxygen from the surrounding tissue in order to maximize their survival.

=== Ability to perform large hair transplant sessions ===
There are four reasons why the follicular unit transplantation procedure allows a hair transplant surgeon to transplant large numbers of grafts in each session:

1. The hair restoration can be completed quickly so that the patient has minimal interference with his/her lifestyle,
2. A larger number of grafts can compensate for the shedding that frequently accompanies a hair transplant, called telogen effluvium,
3. Using large numbers of grafts in each session preserves the donor supply by reducing the number of times incisions are made in the donor area,
4. Extracting large numbers of grafts provides sufficient 1- and 2-hair grafts to create a soft frontal hairline and enough 3- and 4- hair grafts to give the patient the fullest possible look.

== See also ==
- Follicular unit extraction
- Hair cloning
- Hair loss
- Multiple follicular unit grafts
