= Aramis (fragrance) =

1963 fragrance by Estée Lauder Companies

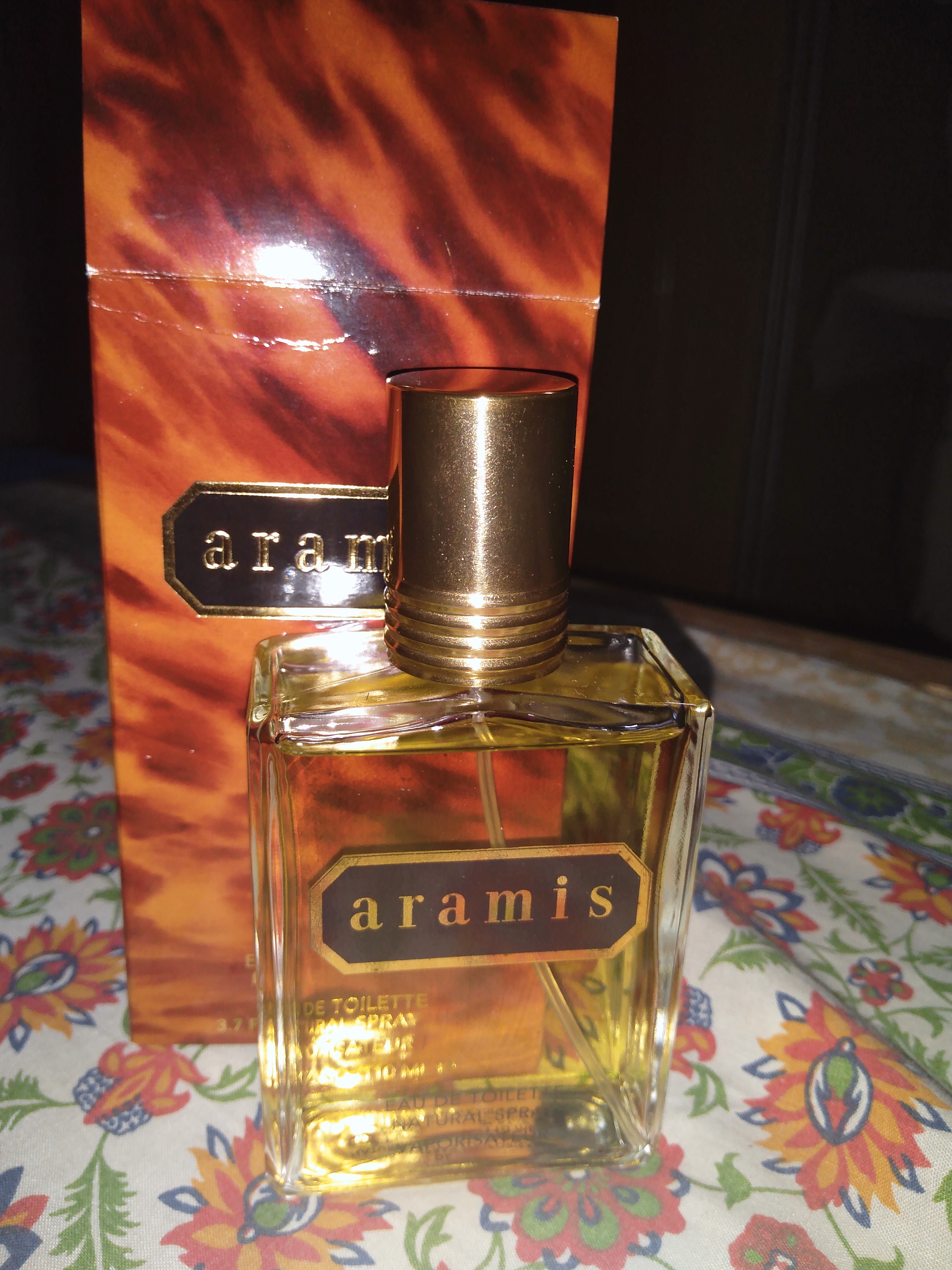

Fragrance by Estée Lauder Companies
- Category: Leather Chypre
- Designed for: Men
- Top notes: Artemisia, aldehydes, bergamot, clary sage, cumin, gardenia, green notes, thyme
- Heart notes: Primarily patchouli and sandalwood
- Base notes: Primarily leather and moss
- Released: 1963
- Label: Aramis
- Perfumer(s): Bernard Chant
- Tagline: "Real Men Use Scent."

Aramis is a leather chypre fragrance that was released in 1963 by Estée Lauder after they noted the tremendous sales success Dana Perfumes experienced when it imported Canoe (1936) to the United States in 1959. Aramis was initially sold alongside Youth-Dew. It was the first men's prestige fragrance widely available in department stores, and is now sold in 120 countries. Aramis was created by perfumer Bernard Chant.

While many people assume that Aramis is named for the character in Dumas's Three Musketeers, Lauder stated, "Aramis is the name of an exotic Turkish root originally used for its aphrodisiac properties."

== History ==
By 1963, Youth-Dew was Estée Lauder's best seller, and the company moved into men's fragrance after watching Dana's Canoe take off in the United States. Dana had imported 4,000 bottles in April 1959 as a test, expecting them to last until Christmas; they sold out within two months, and sales tripled in 1960. Aramis debuted at Estée Lauder counters in December 1963 with a five-product range, since no fine store yet had a separate men's fragrance counter. Its original bottle, suggested by Joseph Lauder, resembled a bourbon bottle.

The line initially sold poorly. In 1965, the company relaunched it with their Aramis Master Plan, a 28-product range of fragrance and grooming products directed by design executive Ira Levy, in square-edged bottles and tortoiseshell-style packaging. Leonard Lauder recalled adding a quarter-ounce bottle to every Estée Lauder gift-with-purchase that year (about 300,000 to 400,000 bottles), after which sales increased.

== Fragrance ==
Bernard Chant at International Flavors & Fragrances created this fragrance. Lauder asked IFF to make a masculine fragrance influenced by Grès Cabochard (1959). When Chant created Cabochard, he was influenced by Robert Piguet Bandit (1944). Like Cabochard and Bandit, Aramis gets its smoky leather note from isobutyl quinoline.

The fragrance has fresh, spicy top notes; warm, woody middle notes; and mossy, leathery base notes:

Top notes
Artemisia, aldehydes, bergamot, clary sage, cumin, gardenia, green notes, thyme
Middle notes
Primarily patchouli and sandalwood; also iris, jasmine, and vetiver
Bottom notes
Primarily leather and moss; also amber, castoreum, and musk

Perfumer and fragrance historian Roja Dove called Aramis "an incredibly refined and distinctive fragrance” that is "as much of a legend as the hero it was named after." Critics compare Aramis to Chanel No. 5 by favorably calling it "No. 5 for Men".

=== Fragrance line extensions ===
Flankers for Aramis (1963):

- Aramis Gold (1998)
- Aramis Ice (2003)
- Aramis Cool (2003)
- Aramis Classic Reserve (2008)
- Aramis Cool Blend (2010)
- Aramis Impeccable (2010)
- Aramis Gentleman (2012)
- Aramis Black (2015)
- Aramis Modern Leather (2017)
- Aramis Special Blend (2019)

Other fragrance lines in the Aramis family:

- Aramis 900 (1973) (Note: Relaunched in 2009 as part of the Gentleman's Collection.)
- Aramis Devin (1977)
- JHL (1981)
- Tuscany Per Uomo (1984)
- New West for Him (1988)
- New West for Her (1990)
- Aramis Havana (1994)
  - Aramis Havana Reserva (1996): Flanker for Aramis Havana
  - Aramis Tobacco Reserve (2018): Flanker for Aramis Havana
- Aramis Pour Elle (1995)
- Aramis Surface (2001)
- Aramis Life (2003)
  - Aramis Life My Summer (2003): A limited edition
- Aramis Bermuda Tonic (2005): A limited edition
- Aramis Always for Him (2006) and Aramis Always for Her (2006)—Launched with the promotion of tennis players Andre Agassi and Stefanie Graf
- Aramis A (2007)
- Aramis Adventurer (2014)
- Aramis Voyager (2016)
- Aramis Intuition (2025)
  - Aramis Intuition Intense (2026): Flanker of Aramis Intuition
