= Hair cloning =

Proposed technique to counter hair loss

Hair cloning, or hair multiplication, is a proposed technique to counter hair loss. The technology is in its early stages, but multiple groups have demonstrated pieces of the technology at a small scale, with a few in commercial development.

Scientists previously assumed that in the case of complete baldness, follicles are completely absent from the scalp, so they cannot be regenerated. However, the follicles are not entirely absent, as there are stem cells in the bald scalp from which the follicles naturally arise. The behavior of these follicles is suggested to be the result of progenitor cell deficiency in these areas.

The basic idea of hair cloning is that healthy follicle cells or dermal papillae can be extracted from the subject from areas that are not bald and are not suffering hair loss. They can be multiplied (cloned) by various culturing methods and the new cells can be injected back into the bald scalp, where they would produce healthy hair.

== Research ==
=== Early trials ===
One of the first companies to begin experimenting with hair cloning was Intercytex. Intercytex tried to clone new hair follicles from the stem cells harvested from the back of the neck. They hoped that if they multiplied the follicles and then implanted them back in the scalp in the bald areas, they would be successful in regrowing the hair itself. In 2008, Intercytex interpreted that they failed in fully developing the hair cloning therapy and decided to discontinue all research.

The first time scientists were able to grow artificial hair follicles from stem cells was in 2010. Scientists at the Technische Universität Berlin in Germany, with Intercytex and several other research teams, took animal cells and created follicles by using them. As a result, they produced follicles "thinner than normal". They were able to clone one or two follicles from an extracted hair.

Aderans Research Institute, a Japanese company, worked on what they called the "Ji Gami" process, which involved the removal of a small strip of the scalp, which is broken down into individual follicular stem cells. After the extraction, these cells are cultured and injected back into the bald areas of the scalp. The trials continued in 2012. Aderans decided to discontinue the funding of its hair multiplication research in July 2013.

=== University of Pennsylvania ===
In 2012, scientists from the University of Pennsylvania School of Medicine published their own findings regarding hair cloning. During their investigation, they found that non-bald and bald scalps have the same number of stem cells, but the progenitor cell number was significantly depleted in the case of the latter. Based on this, they concluded that it is not the absence of the stem cells that are responsible for hair loss but the unsuccessful activation of said cells.

=== Development ===
In 2015, initial trials for human hair were successful in generating new follicles, but the hairs grew in varying directions when implanted in lab mice.

In 2016, scientists in Japan announced they had successfully grown human skin in a lab. The skin was created using induced pluripotent stem cells, and when implanted in lab mice, the skin grew hairs successfully. The group has formed partnerships with Organ Technologies and Kyocera Corporation to commercially develop the research.

In July 2019, a researcher from San Diego–based Stemson Therapeutics, partnered with UCSD, successfully grew his own follicles on lab mice using iPSC-derived epithelial and dermal cell therapy. The hair was aligned properly with a 3D-printed biodegradable shaft. The hairs were permanent and regenerated naturally. Stemson therapeutics closed operations in December 2024.

In October 2022, researchers from the Japan-based Yokohama National University successfully cloned fully-grown hair follicles for the first time in history on lab mice.

In February 2026, Takashi Tsuji, a senior researcher at Riken and chairperson of OrganTech, and his team of researchers including Koh-ei Toyoshima, Miho Ogawa, and Ayako Tsuchiya discovered a key missing 3rd cell type for hair cloning (Identified as PDGFRα⁺ CD34⁺ Sca1⁺ mesenchymal) besides epithelial stem cells and dermal papilla cells. These cells from the dermal condensate region act like "cellular conductors", orchestrating the entire follicle formation process, enabling 100% efficient lab-grown hair follicles. These bioengineered follicles produced 3mm hair shafts and cycled naturally for 68 days when tested on lab mice.

== See also ==
- Hair loss
- Follicular unit transplantation
