= Hair transplantation =

Surgical operation to relocate hair follicles

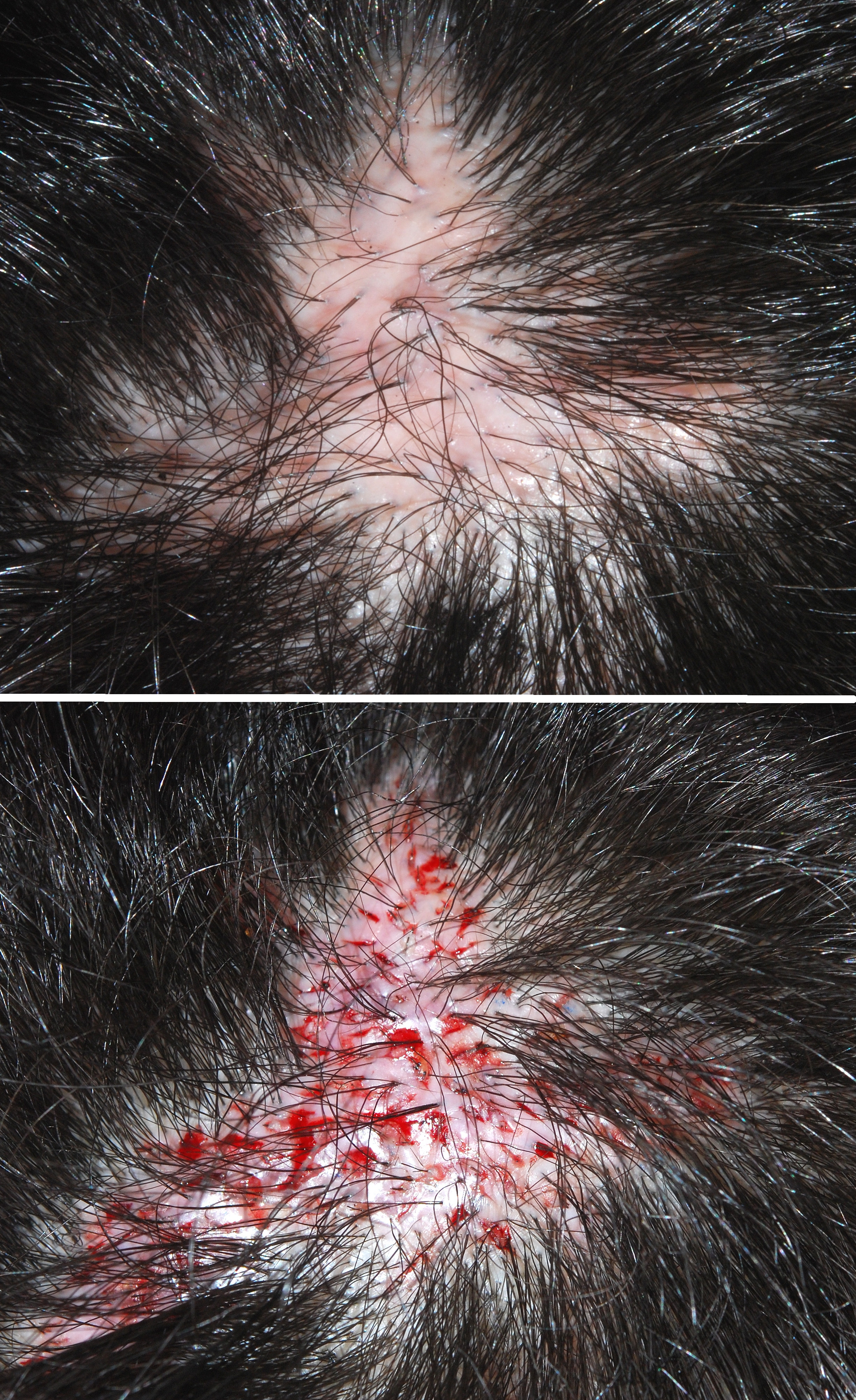
- A graft transplantation to cover the scar of a hidradenitis suppurativa operation on the back of the head

Hair transplantation is a surgical technique that removes hair follicles from one part of the body, called the 'donor site', to a bald or balding part of the body known as the 'recipient site'. The technique is primarily used to treat male pattern baldness. In this minimally invasive procedure, grafts containing hair follicles that are genetically resistant to balding (like the back of the head) are transplanted to the bald scalp.

Hair transplantation can also be used to restore eyelashes, eyebrows, beard hair, chest hair, pubic hair and to fill in scars caused by accidents or surgery such as face-lifts and previous hair transplants. Hair transplantation differs from skin grafting in that grafts contain almost all of the epidermis and dermis surrounding the hair follicle, and many tiny grafts are transplanted rather than a single strip of skin.

Since hair naturally grows in groupings of 1 to 4 hairs, current techniques harvest and transplant hair "follicular units" in their natural groupings. Thus modern hair transplantation can achieve a natural appearance by mimicking original hair orientation. This hair transplant procedure is called follicular unit transplantation (FUT). Donor hair can be harvested in two different ways: strip harvesting, and follicular unit extraction (FUE).

== Procedure ==
=== Pre-operative assessment and planning ===
At an initial consultation, the surgeon analyzes the patient's scalp, discusses their preferences and expectations, and advises them on the best approach (e.g. single vs. multiple sessions) and what results might reasonably be expected. Laxometers are used to measure the looseness (or more specifically, laxity) of the scalp. Pre-operative folliscopy will help to know the actual existing density of hair, so that postoperative results of newly transplanted hair grafts can be accurately assessed. Some patients may benefit with preoperative topical minoxidil application and vitamins.

For several days prior to surgery the patient refrains from using any medicines which might result in intraoperative bleeding and resultant poor grafting. Alcohol and smoking can contribute to poor graft survival. Post operative antibiotics are commonly prescribed to prevent wound or graft infections.

=== Harvesting methods ===
Transplant operations are performed on an outpatient basis, with mild sedation (optional) and injected local anesthesia. The scalp is shampooed and then treated with an antibacterial agent prior to the donor scalp being harvested.

There are several different techniques for harvesting hair follicles, each with their own advantages and disadvantages. Regardless of the harvesting technique, proper extraction of the hair follicle is paramount to ensure the viability of the transplanted hair and avoid transection, the cutting of the hair shaft from the hair follicle. Hair follicles grow at a slight angle to the skin's surface, so transplanted tissue must be removed at a corresponding angle.

There are two main ways in which donor grafts are extracted today: strip excision harvesting, and follicular unit extraction.

==== Strip harvesting (FUT) ====
Strip harvesting (also known as follicular unit transplantation or FUT) is the most common technique for removing hair and follicles from a donor site. The surgeon harvests a strip of skin from the posterior scalp, in an area of good hair growth. A single-, double-, or triple-bladed scalpel is used to remove strips of hair-bearing tissue from the donor site. Each incision is planned so that intact hair follicles are removed. The excised strip is about 1–1.5 x 15–30 cm in size. While closing the resulting wound, assistants begin to dissect individual follicular unit grafts, which are small, naturally formed groupings of hair follicles, from the strip. Working with binocular Stereo-microscopes, they carefully remove excess fibrous and fatty tissue while trying to avoid damage to the follicular cells that will be used for grafting. The latest method of closure is called 'Trichophytic closure' which results in much finer scars at the donor area.

The surgeon then uses very small micro blades or fine needles to puncture the sites for receiving the grafts, placing them in a predetermined density and pattern, and angling the wounds in a consistent fashion to promote a realistic hair pattern. The technicians generally do the final part of the procedure, inserting the individual grafts in place.

Strip harvesting will leave a thin linear scar in the donor area, which is typically covered by a patient's hair even at relatively short lengths. The recovery period is around 2 weeks and will require the stitches/staples to be removed by medical personnel or sub cuticular suturing can be done.

==== Follicular unit extraction (FUE) ====
With Follicular Unit Extraction or FUE harvesting, individual follicular units containing 1 to 4 hairs are removed under local anesthesia; this micro removal typically uses tiny punches of between 0.6mm and 1.0mm in diameter. The surgeon then uses very small micro blades or fine needles to puncture the sites for receiving the grafts, placing them in a predetermined density and pattern, and angling the wounds in a consistent fashion to promote a realistic hair pattern. The technicians generally do the final part of the procedure, inserting the individual grafts in place.

FUE takes place in a single long session or multiple small sessions. The FUE procedure is more time-consuming than strip surgery. An FUE surgery time varies according to the surgeons experience, speed in harvesting and patient characteristics. The procedure can take anywhere from a couple hours to extract 200 grafts for a scar correction to a surgery over two consecutive days for a megasession of 2,500 to 3,000 grafts. With the FUE Hair Transplant procedure there are restrictions on patient candidacy. Clients are selected for FUE based on a fox test, though there is some debate about the usefulness of this in screening clients for FUE.

FUE can give very natural results. The advantage over strip harvesting is that FUE harvesting negates the need for large areas of scalp tissue to be harvested, so there is no linear incision on the back of the head and it doesn't leave a linear scar. Because individual follicles are removed, only small, punctate scars remain which are virtually not visible and any post-surgical pain and discomfort is minimized. As no suture removal is required, recovery from Micro Grafting FUE is less than 7 days.

Disadvantages include increased surgical times and higher cost to the patient. It is challenging for new surgeons because the procedure is physically demanding and the learning curve to acquire the skills necessary is lengthy and tough. Some surgeons note that FUE can lead to a lower ratio of successfully transplanted follicles as compared to strip harvesting.

==== Robotic hair restoration ====
Robotic hair restoration devices utilize cameras and robotic arms to assist the surgeon with the FUE procedure. In 2009, NeoGraft became the first robotic surgical device FDA approved for hair restoration. The ARTAS System was FDA approved in 2011 for use in harvesting follicular units from brown-haired and black-haired men.

=== Applications ===
There are a number of applications for hair transplant surgery, including:

- Androgenetic alopecia
- Eyebrow transplant
- Frontal hair line lowering or reconstruction (naturally high hairlines without an existing hair loss condition)

If donor hair numbers from the back of the head are insufficient, it is possible to perform body hair transplantation (BHT) on appropriate candidates who have available donor hair on the chest, back, shoulders, torso and/or legs. Body hair transplant surgery can only be performed by the FUE harvesting method and, so, requires the skills of an experienced FUE surgeon. However, there are several factors for a potential BHT candidate to consider prior to surgery. These include understanding the natural difference in textural characteristics between body hair and scalp hair, growth rates, and having realistic expectations about the results of BHT surgery.

=== Cost ===
The cost of hair transplantation depends on the individual hair loss and consequently on the number of necessary grafts. The average price per graft ranges between US$1.07 in Turkey up to US$7.00 in Canada. Some clinics also offer all-inclusive packages. In the UK the cost can be between £1,000–£30,000 depending on location and area of implant.

== Side effects ==
Hair thinning, known as "shock loss", is a common side effect that is usually temporary. Bald patches are also common, as fifty to a hundred hairs can be lost each day.

== History ==
The use of both scalp flaps, in which a band of tissue with its original blood supply is shifted to the continue bald area, and free grafts dates back to the 19th century. In 1897, Menahem Hodara successfully implanted hair taken from the unaffected areas of the scalp on to the scars that were left bald by favus. Modern transplant techniques began in Japan in the 1930s, where surgeons used small grafts, and even "follicular unit grafts" to replace damaged areas of eyebrows or lashes, but not to treat baldness. Their efforts did not receive worldwide attention at the time, and the traumas of World War II kept their advances isolated for another two decades.

The modern era of hair transplantation in the Western world was ushered in the late 1950s, when New York dermatologist Norman Orentreich began to experiment with free donor grafts to balding areas in patients with male pattern baldness. Previously it had been thought that transplanted hair would thrive no more than the original hair at the "recipient" site. Orentreich demonstrated that such grafts were "donor dominant," as the new hairs grew and lasted just as they would have at their original home.

Advancing the theory of donor dominance, Walter P. Unger, M.D. defined the parameters of the "Safe Donor Zone" from which the most permanent hair follicles could be extracted for hair transplantation. As transplanted hair will only grow in its new site for as long as it would have in its original one, these parameters continue to serve as the fundamental foundation for hair follicle harvesting, whether by strip method or FUE.

For the next twenty years, surgeons worked on transplanting smaller grafts, but results were only minimally successful, with 2–4 mm "plugs" leading to a doll's head-like appearance. In the 1980s, strip excisions began to replace the plug technique, and Carlos Uebel in Brazil popularized using large numbers of small grafts, while in the United States William Rassman began using thousands of "micrografts" in a single session.

In the late 1980s, B.L. Limmer introduced the use of the stereo-microscope to dissect a single donor strip into small micrografts.

The follicular unit hair transplant procedure has continued to evolve, becoming more refined and minimally invasive as the size of the graft incisions have become smaller. These smaller and less invasive incisions enable surgeons to place a larger number of follicular unit grafts into a given area. With the new "gold standard" of ultra refined follicular unit hair transplantation, over 50 grafts can be placed per square centimeter, when appropriate for the patient.

Surgeons have also devoted more attention to the angle and orientation of the transplanted grafts. The adoption of the "lateral slit" technique in the early 2000s enabled hair transplant surgeons to orient 2 to 4 hair follicular unit grafts so that they splay out across the scalp's surface. This enabled the transplanted hair to lie better on the scalp and provide better coverage to the bald areas. One disadvantage however, is that lateral incisions also tend to disrupt the scalp's vascularity more than sagittals. Thus sagittal incisions transect less hairs and blood vessels assuming the cutting instruments are of the same size.

One of the advantages of sagittals is that they do a much better job of sliding in and around existing hairs to avoid follicle transection. This makes a strong case for physicians who do not require shaving of the recipient area. The lateral incisions bisect existing hairs perpendicular (horizontal) like a T while sagittal incisions run parallel (vertical) alongside and in between existing hairs. The use of perpendicular (lateral/coronal) slits versus parallel (sagittal) slits, however, has been heavily debated in patient-based hair transplant communities. Many elite hair transplant surgeons typically adopt a combination of both methods based on what is best for the individual patient.

== Research and future techniques ==
Stem cells and dermal papilla cells have been discovered in hair follicles. Research on these follicular cells may lead to successes in treating baldness through hair multiplication (HM), also known as hair cloning.
