= Haarmann =

Haarmann is a German surname. Notable people with the surname include:

- Erich Haarmann (1882–1945), German geologist
- Fritz Haarmann (1879–1925), prolific German cannibalistic serial killer, rapist, and fraudster
- Harald Haarmann (born 1946), German linguist
- Mala Gaonkar Haarmann, American businesswoman
- Oliver Haarmann (born 1967), German private equity financier
- Stephan Haarmann
- Wilhelm Haarmann (1847–1931), German chemist

== See also ==
- Haarmann, a play by Marius von Mayenburg
- Haarmann, a book by Theodor Lessing
- Haarmann Hemmelrath, a now-defunct German law firm
- Harman (disambiguation)
