= Searchlight Capital =

American private equity firm

Searchlight Capital Partners
- Type: Private
- Industry: Private equity
- Founded: 2010; 16 years ago
- Founder: Eric Zinterhofer; Oliver Haarmann; Erol Uzumeri
- Headquarters: 745 Fifth Avenue, New York, New York, US
- Number of locations: New York City, London, Toronto
- Area served: North America, Europe
- AUM: US$15.1 billion (2024)
- Number of employees: 130 (August 2024)
- Website: www.searchlightcap.com

Searchlight Capital Partners is a private equity firm based in the United States, United Kingdom and Canada, with $15 billion in assets under management.

== History ==
Searchlight Capital was founded in 2010 by Eric Zinterhofer, Oliver Haarmann, and Erol Uzumeri, its founding partners. It has offices in New York City, London and Toronto. Searchlight Capital invests across five sectors: technology, services, industrials, healthcare and consumer.

In January 2012, Searchlight Capital completed the acquisition of the famed rubber Wellington Boot manufacturer Hunter Boot Ltd. In April 2012, Searchlight closed its first fund Searchlight Fund I at $860m.

In July 2014, Searchlight Capital acquired the Canadian meat and frozen food retail chain M&M Food Market.

In June 2015, Searchlight Capital (40%) and Liberty Global (60%) jointly acquired Choice Cable TV, Puerto Rico's second-largest cable operator, for US$272.5 million. In October 2015, the company acquired a majority stake in the Canadian apparel brand Roots Canada, with a minority stake still held by its founders.

In December 2015, Searchlight closed its second fund with $1.94 billion of commitments.

In April 2018, Searchlight acquired Canadian enterprise telecommunications company Mitel in an all-cash transaction of $2 billion.

In July 2021, Searchlight acquired the fixed wireless Internet service provider All Points Broadband. In October 2021 Searchlight acquired a minority stake of M&A insurance MGA Euclid Transactional, based in New York.

In November 2020, Searchlight Capital closed Fund III at $3.4billion, beating $2.75billion target.

In October 2022, Searchlight Capital bought a minority stake of Singapore shipmanager Synergy Marine Group in an undisclosed deal.

In April 2023, Searchlight Capital became bidding partner of Providence Equity for its agreed takeover offer of global event organiser Hyve Group, with the deal completed in June 2023. In May 2023, Searchlight, together with payments company Rev Worldwide, acquired Netspend consumer business from Global Payments in an all-cash transaction valued at $1 billion.

In July 2023, the company announced the acquisition of Gresham House, a UK-based asset manager listed on the London Stock Exchange, in a £470 million deal.

In June 2024, Searchlight Capital in co-operation with Ares Management invested £500 million in a preferred equity transaction in RSK Group, a UK-based environmental, engineering and technical services group.

== Notable people ==
- Eric Zinterhofer (born 1971) is an American private equity financier and founding partner of Searchlight Capital. He is non-executive chairman of Charter Communications' board of directors and was its lead independent director from May 2016 to November 2023. Zinterhofer is also a former co-head of media and telecom investing at Apollo Global Management from 1998 to 2010.
- Oliver Haarmann (born 1967) is a German private equity financer, and a founding partner of Searchlight Capital. Previously, He was a senior partner of the investment firm KKR for 12 years. He is chairman of the board of United Kingdom based charity IntoUniversity. From 2012-2022, Haarmanserved as a member of the board of trustees of London based arts organisation Artangel, and is an advisory board member of the Aspire Institute as well as a member of the board of trustees of Brown University.
- Ajit Pai (born 1973) is an American lawyer who served as chairman of the Federal Communications Commission (FCC) from 2017 to 2021. He has been a partner at Searchlight Capital since April 2021, specialising in investments in the technology, media, and telecommunications sectors. Pai was a trial attorney for the U.S. Department of Justice's Antitrust Division from 1998 to 2001. From 2001 until 2003 he was associate general counsel at Verizon and from 2003 served as deputy chief counsel for the U.S. Senate Judiciary Committee until 2004. From 2007 until 2011, Pai held senior roles in the U.S. Department of Justice and the FCC's Office of General Counsel. Nominated by President Barack Obama, in 2012, he joined the FCC and became its chairman under President Donald Trump in 2017 until January 2021. Since February 2024 Pai has been serving as an at-large trustee on the board of America's Public Television Stations (APTS).
