= Khadija Saye =

Gambian-British photographer (1992–2017)

- Born: Khadija Mohammadou Saye; 30 July 1992; Hammersmith, London, England
- Died: 14 June 2017 (aged 24); North Kensington, London, England
- Cause of death: Grenfell Tower fire
- Other name: Ya-Haddy Sisi Saye
- Education: University for the Creative Arts (BA)
- Occupations: Artist; Photographer
- Known for: Photography and artwork
- Website: sayephoto.format.com estateofkhadijasaye.co.uk

Khadija Mohammadou Saye (30 July 1992 – 14 June 2017), also known as Ya-Haddy Sisi Saye, was a Gambian-British photographer. Her photography explored her Gambian-British identity and was exhibited in 2017 in the first Diaspora Pavilion at the Venice Biennale. Saye died in the Grenfell Tower fire.

== Life and work ==
Saye was born in Hammersmith and grew up in Ladbroke Grove. She initially attended the Sion Manning Roman Catholic Girls' School in North Kensington. Her love of photography was fostered by after-school clubs run by IntoUniversity, a programme that seeks to remove barriers to participation in the arts by children from disadvantaged communities. At age 16 she won a scholarship to Rugby School in Rugby. Later she attended the University for the Creative Arts at Farnham and obtained a photography degree.

Saye's photography explored her Gambian-British identity. Her series of six wet plate collodion tintypes entitled Dwellings: in this space we breathe, based on Gambian spiritual practices, was exhibited in the Diaspora Pavilion at the 57th Venice Biennale from May to November 2017. Saye took part in a BBC TV documentary, Venice Biennale: Sink or Swim, which "follows a team of diverse emerging artists as they install and prepare to launch the first ever Diaspora Pavilion in a Venetian palazzo during the Venice Biennale."

Saye was also an activist and educator. She volunteered at Jawaab to educate and empower young Muslims, and from 2015 to 2016 worked at PEER, a comtemporary arts centre in Hoxton, as a Creative Access intern.

== Personal life and death ==
Saye lived with her mother, Mary Ajaoi Augustus Mendy, on the 20th floor of Grenfell Tower in North Kensington. She was mentored by artist Nicola Green and became friends with Green's husband, Tottenham MP David Lammy. Both Saye and her mother died in the Grenfell Tower fire on 14 June 2017.

== Legacy ==
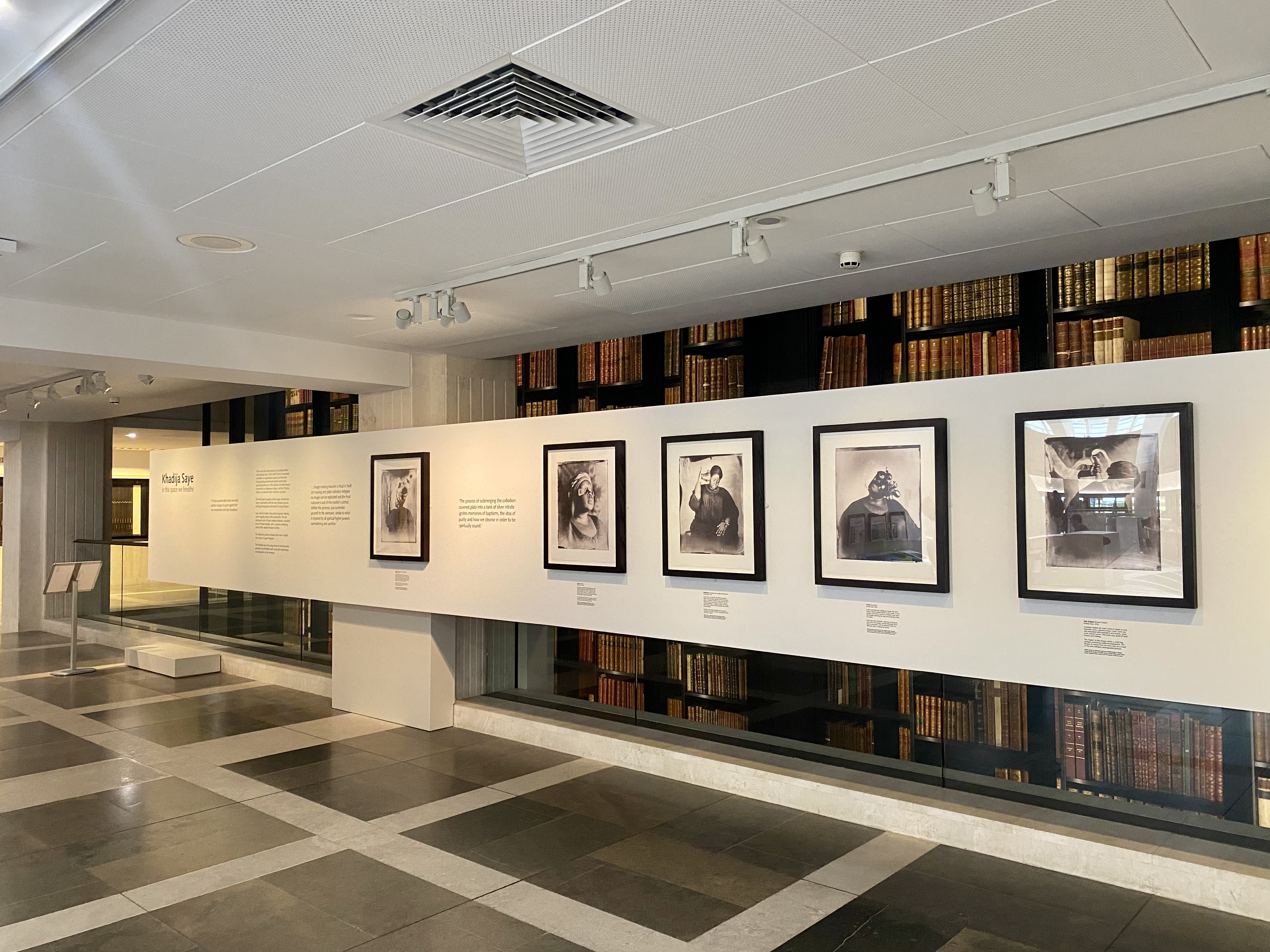
Saye's In this space we breathe at the British Library, September 2021

The BBC TV programme on the Venice Biennale that included Saye, originally scheduled to air on 17 June 2017, was postponed after her death and transmitted in September 2017 as Venice Biennale: Britain's New Voices.

Most of Saye's work was destroyed in the fire. The six tintypes on exhibit in Venice survived, as did three others. Portfolios of nine silkscreen prints were produced from high-resolution scans of these works. In June 2017, Tate Britain announced that it would exhibit a silkscreen from one of these sets, Sothiou, in the memorials section. Works by her were part of the reopening show of Kettle's Yard in Cambridge on 10 February 2018. Complete series of nine silkscreens were exhibited at Victoria Miro Gallery in London from 2 October to 2 November 2019 as part of Rock My Soul, an exhibition of black female artists curated by the artist Isaac Julien, and from 3 December 2020 to 7 October 2021 in the Entrance Hall Gallery of the British Library. Between 23 October 2020 and 1 August 2021 the British Library also exhibited one of the original tintypes, Peitaw, as part of the exhibition Unfinished Business: The Fight for Women's Rights.

Sales of the silkscreen portfolios and other works by Saye benefit her estate and the Khadija Saye Arts arts education programme at IntoUniversity, which was officially launched in July 2020. The launch coincided with the unveiling of Breath is Invisible, in which large-scale prints of the nine images in Saye's In this space we breathe series were displayed across the façade of 236 Westbourne Grove in West London. This was the first of three exhibitions to run at the space intended to explore social inequality and injustice. An auction of her works at Christie's as part of the Post-War and Contemporary Day Auction in 2018 realised £8,750 for the first of the silkscreen portfolios, and £43,750 for the original tintype of Nak Bejjen from In this space we breathe.

A paid internship at PEER has been set up in Saye's name for young BAME artists, and in 2019 the London Transport Museum launched a photography fellowship programme in her name.

== Selected exhibitions ==
- Discerning Eye, Mall Galleries, London, 2014
- Diaspora Pavilion, Venice Biennale, Palazzo Pisani S Marina, Venice, Italy, 2017
- Tate Modern, London, 2017
- Actions, Kettle's Yard, Cambridge, 2018
- In this space we breathe, British Library, London, 2020–21
- Unfinished Business: The Fight for Women's Rights, British Library, London, 2020–21
