= Oliver Haarmann =

German businessman

- Education: Brown University; Harvard Business School
- Occupation: Businessman
- Title: Founding partner, Searchlight Capital Partners
- Spouse: Mala Gaonkar (divorced)
- Children: 2

Carl Ludwig Oliver Haarmann (born 1967) is a German private equity financier, and a founding partner of Searchlight Capital Partners. He is a minority owner of the New York Islanders.

== Early life ==
Oliver Haarmann was born in September 1967. He earned a bachelor's degree in history and international relations from Brown University in 1990, and an MBA from Harvard Business School in 1996.

== Career ==
Haarmann was a managing director and partner at Kohlberg Kravis Roberts (KKR). In June 2007, The Daily Telegraph reported that only one of KKR's (then taking over Alliance Boots) eight London-based partners (not Haarmann) was tax-domiciled in the UK.

Searchlight Capital was established in 2010 by Eric Zinterhofer, Haarmann, and Erol Uzumeri, its founding partners.

Haarmann is a director of Ocean Outdoor and Hunter Boot.

He is a trustee of the Surgo Foundation, and IntoUniversity.

He is a minority owner of the New York Islanders National Hockey League team.

== Personal life ==
Haarmann was married to fellow private equity businesswoman Mala Gaonkar. They have two sons.

As of July 2024, he was dating actress Reese Witherspoon.
