= Lithuanian Rifle Corps =

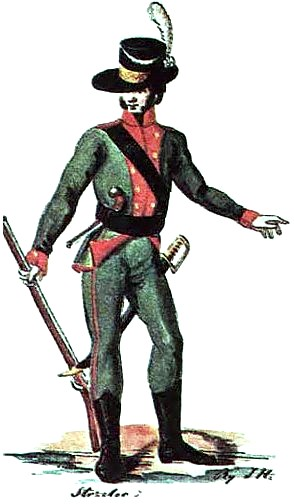
- Rifleman (Strzelec)
- Active: 1792-1794
- Country: Grand Duchy of Lithuania
- Type: Light Infantry

The Lithuanian Rifle Corps (Polish: Korpus strzelców) was a riflemen unit of the Grand Duchy of Lithuania.

== History ==
By 1789, sharpshooter platoons were formed in each Lithuanian infantry battalion. In 1791, the platoons were gathered into regimental companies. Finally, they were consolidated into the Rifle Corps. In 1792, the rifle corps was formed in General Byszewski's reserve division.

== Composition ==
The Lithuanian Rifle Corps was composed of four battalions.

== Uniforms ==
Officers had a green uniform with poppy red facings, one golden epaulette and black Hessian boots.

== Bibliography ==
=== References ===
- Benda, Jan (1936). "Zasadnicze barwy mundurów wojska Obojga Narodów". Broń i Barwa. 9.
- Rospond, Vincent W. (2013). Commonwealth Armies of the Partitions 1770–1794. Great Britain: Osprey Publishing. ISBN 978-1-84908855-8.
