= Clement James =

Clement James may refer to:

- The ClementJames Centre, a British charity based in London
- Clement James (footballer) (born 1981), British footballer
