= Le Chameau =

French manufacturer of rubber boots and outdoor footwear

- Industry: Footwear
- Founded: 1927
- Founder: Claude Chamot
- Headquarters: France
- Products: Rubber boots, outdoor footwear

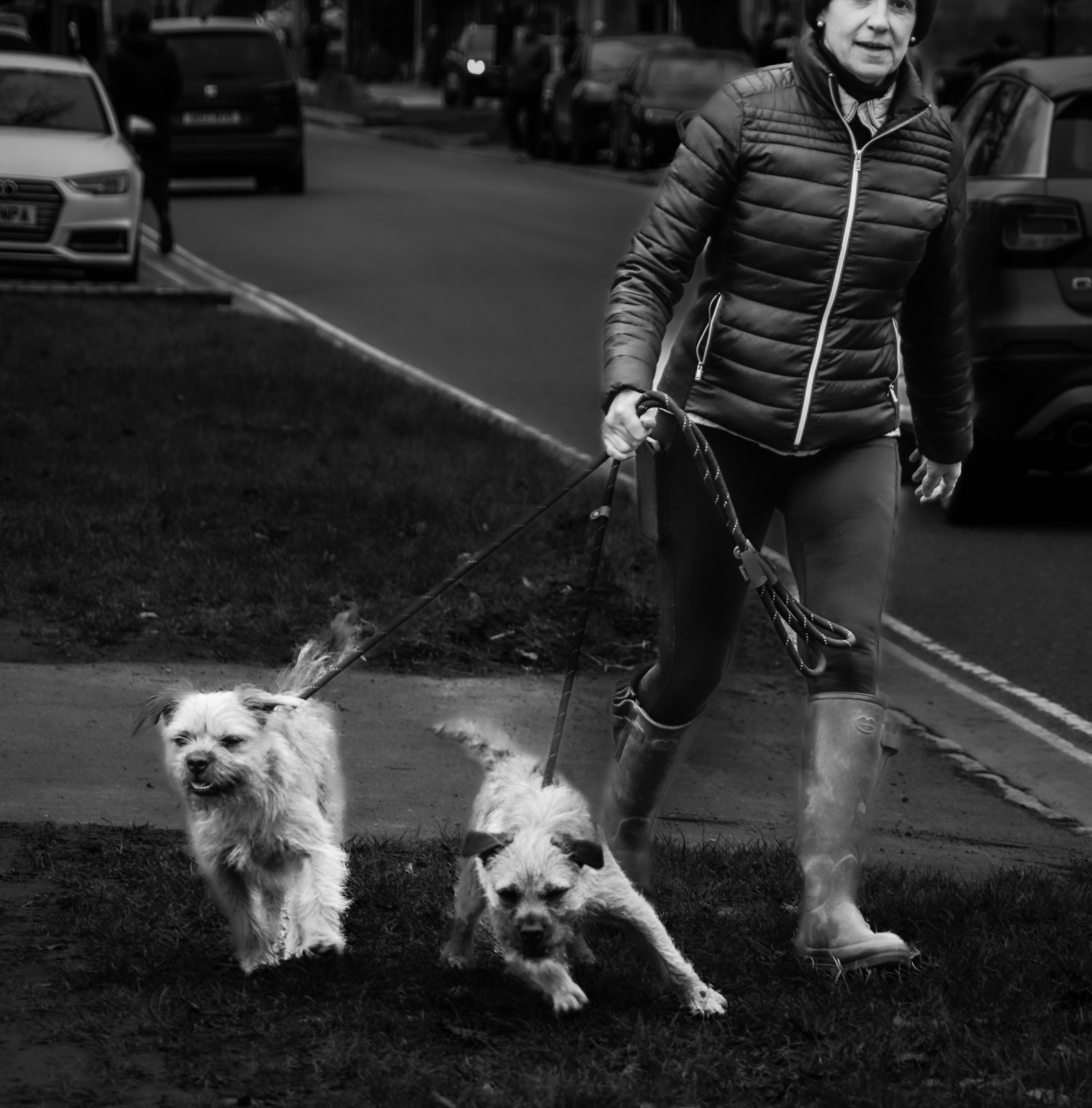
Le Chameau rubber boots in use.

Le Chameau is a French manufacturer of wellingtons and outdoor footwear. The company was founded in 1927 and is associated with the bootmaker Claude Chamot. It is best known for its handmade wellington boots, particularly the Chasseur model, and has been covered in European and British business, country sports, and lifestyle press.

== Origins and founder ==
Le Chameau traces its origins to 1927 in Cherbourg, Normandy, a region historically shaped by maritime activity, agriculture, and heavy industry. The company is associated with Claude Chamot, a bootmaker who, according to later historical accounts and company records, sought to improve existing industrial rubber footwear by combining waterproof performance with greater comfort, flexibility, and durability.

Independent historical features describe Chamot’s work as a practical response to the demands of farmers, fishermen, and rural workers operating in persistently wet conditions. Early production focused on vulcanised natural rubber boots assembled largely by hand rather than through mechanised mass production.

During the interwar period, the business expanded beyond local production. Manufacturing capacity increased during the 1930s, with further growth after the Second World War as demand for durable waterproof footwear rose across Europe.

== Post-war development and international expansion ==
Following the Second World War, Le Chameau expanded its manufacturing operations beyond mainland France. In 1949, production facilities were established in Casablanca, Morocco, which became a significant centre for the company’s rubber boot manufacturing during the second half of the twentieth century. At this point, the brand name "Le Chameau" was adopted.

Throughout the latter decades of the twentieth century, Le Chameau’s boots became increasingly associated with agricultural, equestrian, shooting and countryside use, particularly in the United Kingdom. British country publications later described the brand as a premium option within the wellington boot market, distinguished by fit options and hand-finished construction rather than fashion-led design.

== Ownership and corporate history ==
Le Chameau operated under various ownership structures during the late twentieth and early twenty-first centuries. In 2012, the company was sold by its then parent company Lafuma to the private equity firm Marwyn Management Partners. British newspapers reported on the transaction and discussed the brand’s position within the heritage footwear sector.

In 2019, FashionNetwork.com reported that the business was being explored for sale following its period under Marwyn ownership.

In October 2025, regulatory announcements relating to Marwyn-associated investment vehicles referred to a potential transaction involving Silvercloud Holdings Limited, described as holding a majority interest in Le Chameau Holdings Limited.

A UK holding company, Le Chameau Holdings Limited, is registered at Companies House.

== Manufacturing ==
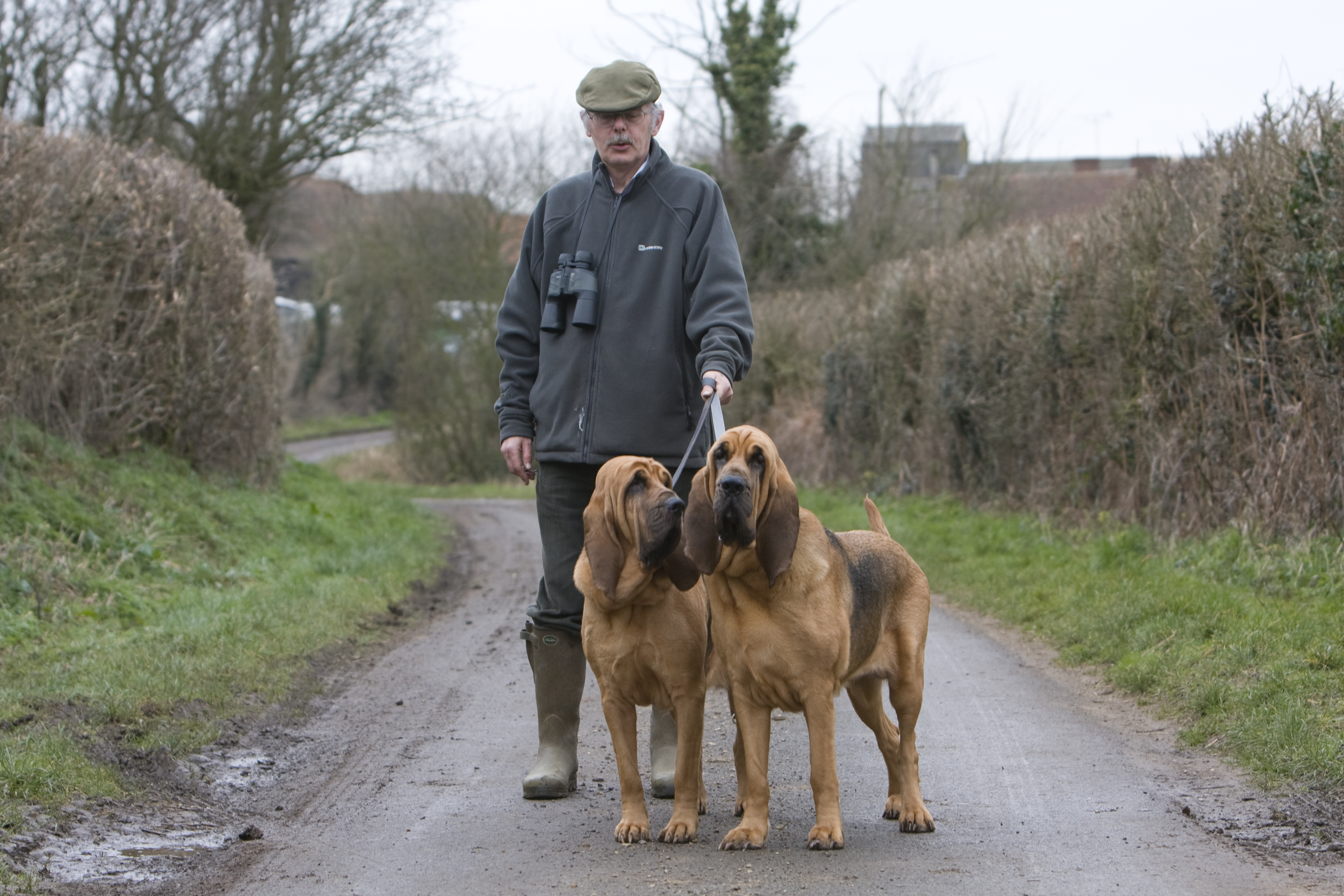
Le Chameau boots worn at a countryside event.

Le Chameau describes its rubber boots as being handmade using natural rubber, with each boot assembled by a single specialist bootmaker, referred to by the company as a maître bottier. According to company material and independent press features, training for this role typically takes several months.

Manufacturing has historically taken place in France and Morocco. Later reporting in British lifestyle and luxury press has described production as involving hand-cut rubber components assembled on a last, followed by vulcanisation to bond the material and form a waterproof structure.

== Products ==
Le Chameau’s product range has centred on rubber boots and outdoor footwear. The Chasseur boot is among the company’s best-known models and has been described in British country publications as a long-running design, with coverage noting the availability of multiple calf sizes.

In addition to leather-lined rubber boots, the company has produced neoprene-lined models, walking boots, and other outdoor footwear, as well as accessories associated with countryside use.

== Use and reception ==
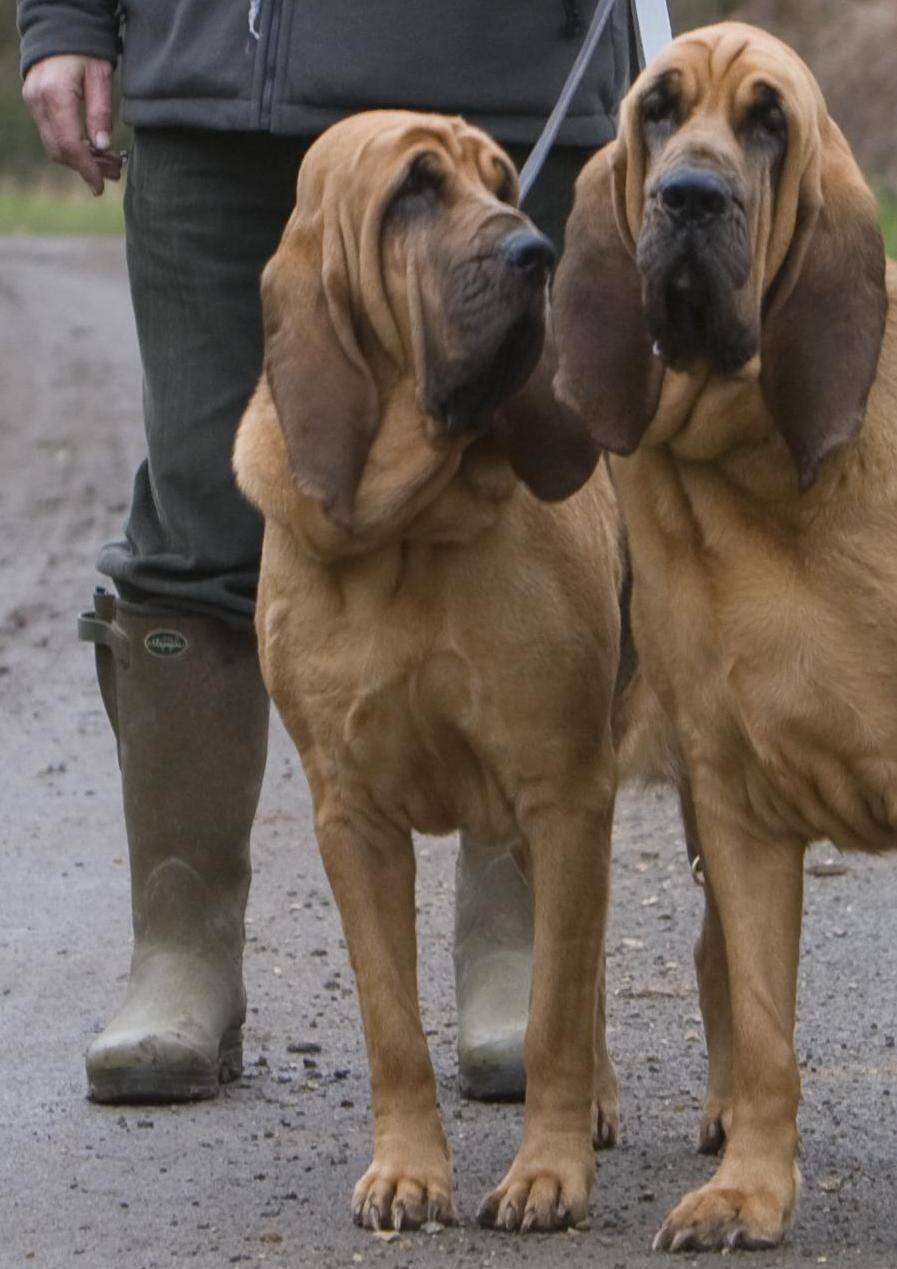
Le Chameau boots in field use.

Le Chameau boots have been regularly featured in British country, equestrian, and shooting publications. Reviews in outlets such as Country Life and Horse & Hound have discussed their use in agricultural, equestrian, and sporting contexts.

British newspapers have also reported on the brand’s visibility among members of the British royal family, particularly following media coverage in the early 2010s that referred to the public wearing of Le Chameau boots by Catherine, Princess of Wales.

== See also ==
- Wellington boot
- Footwear
- Country sports
