= Hutchinson SA =

French rubber manufacturer

Hutchinson

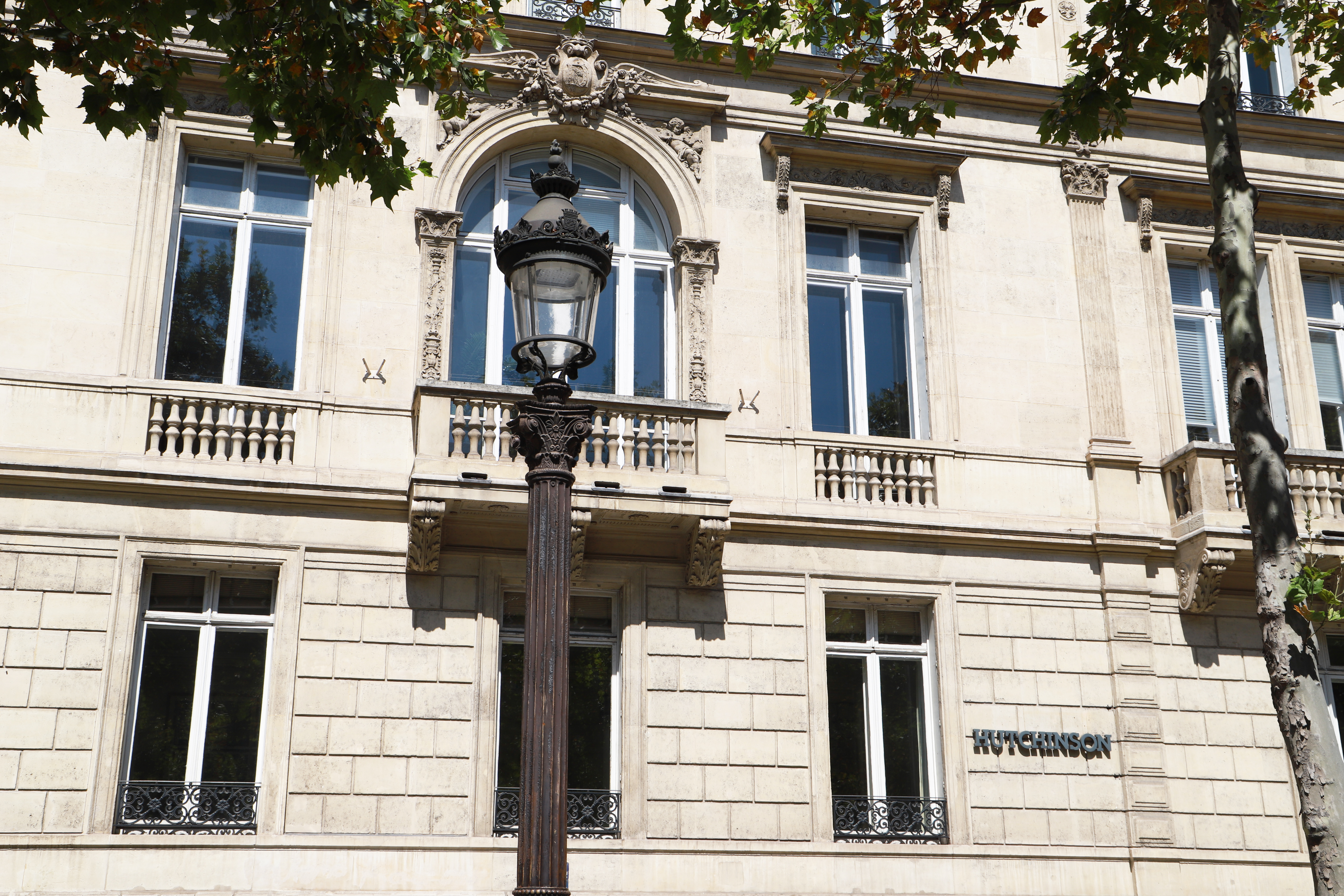
- Hutchinson's Corporate Headquarters on the Champs-Élysées
- Industry: Automotive; Aerospace; Defense; Rail; Energy
- Founded: France 1853; 173 years ago
- Headquarters: Clichy
- Key people: Hélène Moreau-Leroy, CEO
- Products: Body Sealing Systems, Precision Sealing Systems, Fluid Management Systems, Materials and Structures, Vibration Control Systems, Belt Drive Systems
- Revenue: ▲€ 5 Billion (2025)
- Number of employees: 40,000
- Website: www.hutchinson.com

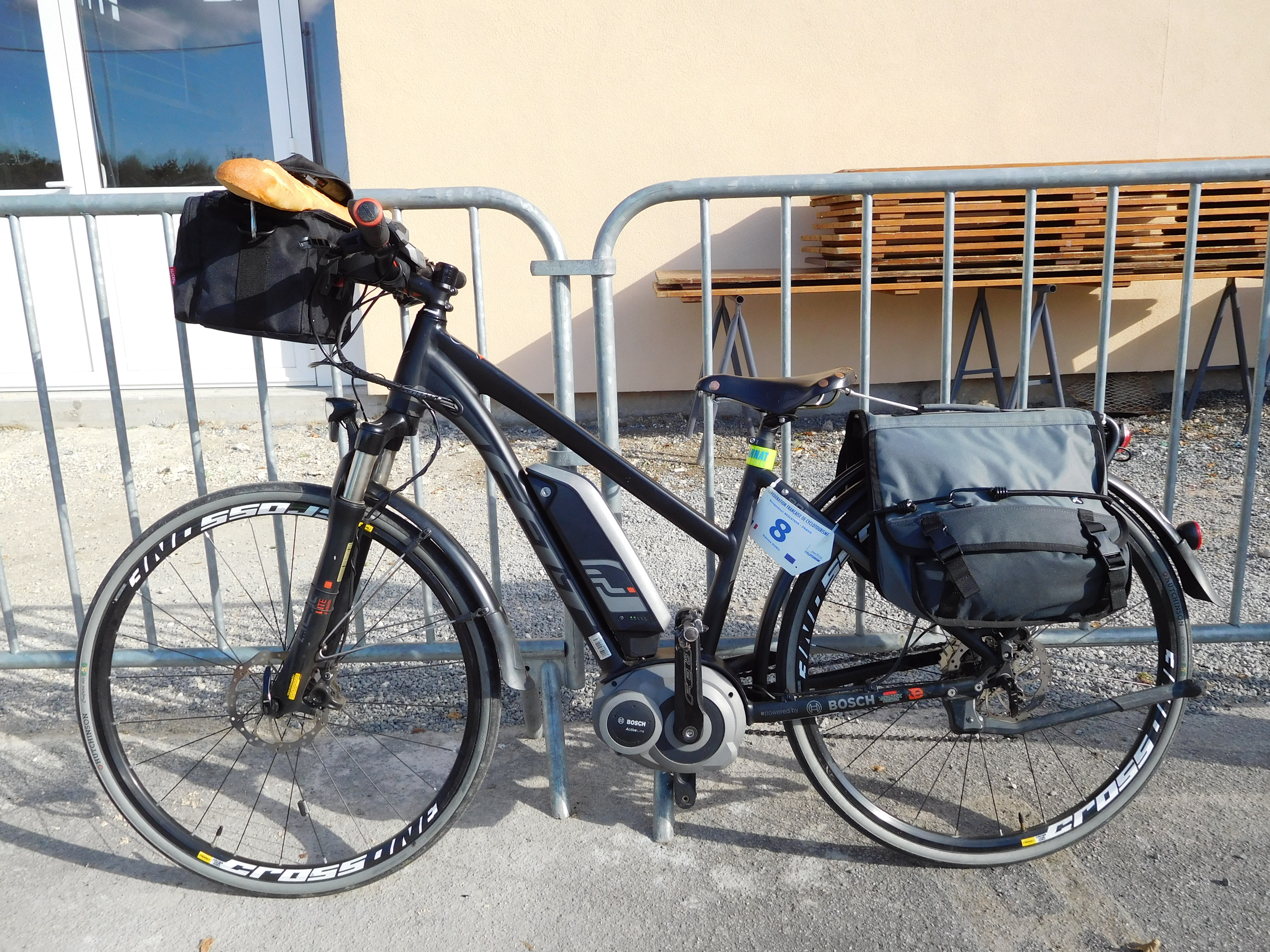
Bicycle with Hutchinson tires.

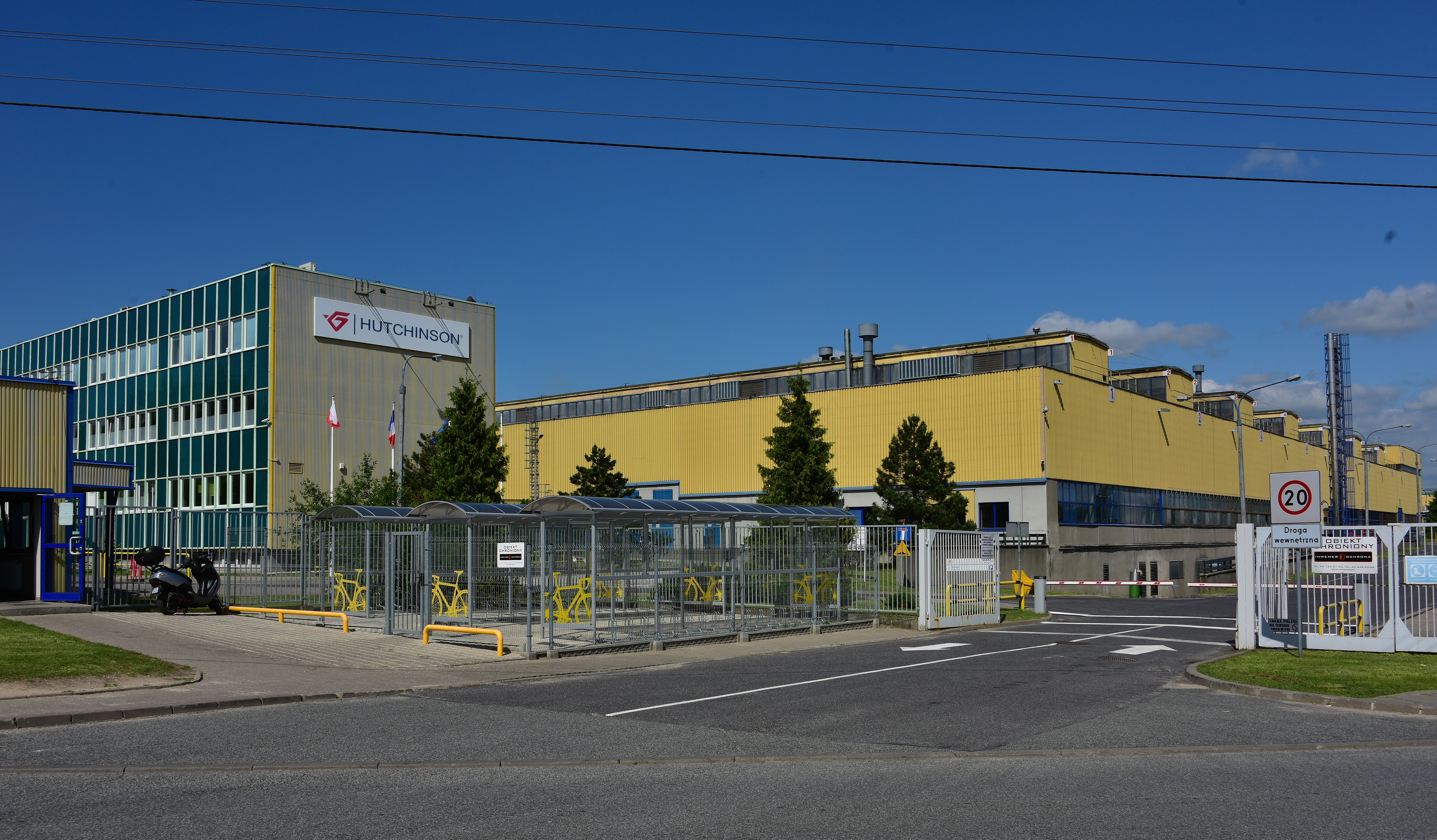
A Hutchinson factory in Łódź, Poland.

Hutchinson is a French multinational Group known as the third-largest manufacturer of non-tire rubber in the world. It was founded in 1853 by Hiram Hutchinson in Châlette-sur-Loing, France.

The Group manufactured a range of rubber goods, including the Aigle boots. Over the years, Hutchinson has become a player in the automotive, aerospace, defense, and cycling sectors. The organization places a great emphasis on the development of products.

Hutchinson is headquartered in Clichy with a presence in 26 countries and over 40,000 employees.

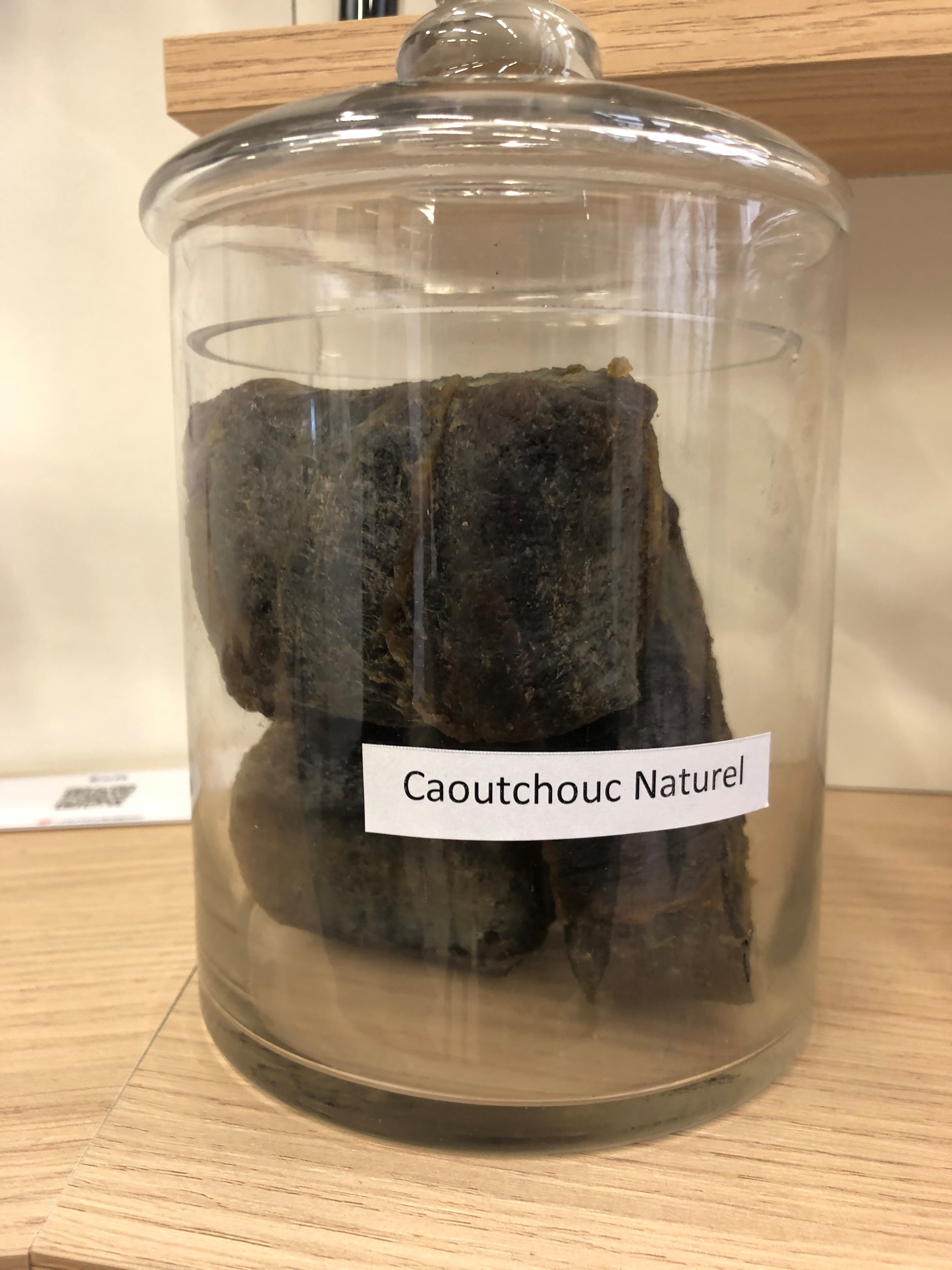
Pieces of natural vulcanized rubber at Hutchinson's Research and Innovation Center in France.

== History ==
=== Hiram Hutchinson and the founding of the Group ===
Hiram Hutchinson was a North American industrialist with British roots. He came to France in 1853, after acquiring the patent rights for rubber vulcanization from Charles Goodyear (Goodyear). That same year, he founded Hutchinson, called then "La Compagnie du Caoutchouc Souple" - The "Soft Rubber Company". Back in the U.S., Hutchinson researched further applications for rubber. The results of his studies led to a variety of products manufactured by the group today.

In the early years, Hutchinson was involved in the manufacture of boots.

In the 1900s, Hutchinson diversified its operations from tire manufacturing and began producing coated canvases for aircraft and airships. The company also expanded into other areas, including clothing, automobiles, heavyweights, belts, and more.

Since 1970, Hutchinson has been a subsidiary of TotalEnergies, a global producer and supplier of hydrocarbons and other energy sources.

=== Unification of brands ===
In March 2013, all Hutchinson entities were brought together under a single commercial brand. The Hutchinson brand identity was redesigned with a new logo and tagline.

In January 2019, Hutchinson announced the acquisition of Midé Technology Corporation, a U.S. engineering company specializing in smart materials and mechatronics. That same year, Hutchinson also acquired a majority stake in TCSA, a company specializing in engine thermal management, and finalized the acquisition of PFW Aerospace, a specialist in aeronautical tubing and ducting previously owned by Airbus.

In February 2026, Hutchinson announced the acquisition of Cox & Co Company (a U.S. leader in low‑power de‑icing solutions) and its subsidiary Prime Technology (a U.S. expert in naval and industrial instrumentation), further strengthening its position as a Tier‑1 strategic partner in the aerospace sector.

== Markets ==
In addition to being one of the world's largest players in the rubber market, Hutchinson is also present in the automotive, aerospace, railway, industrial, defense, energy and cycling sectors.

=== Automotive and e-Mobility ===
Hutchinson provides automotive seals, fluid transfer systems, and vibration control technologies that reduce noise and improve comfort. Hutchinson’s products can be found on car models such as the Mazda 3.

=== Aerospace and Defense ===
In the aerospace industry, Hutchinson provides engine systems, ducting and other components that improve aircraft performance and safety. They also play a role in the defense sector, providing armor technology and defense-related products.

=== New Energy and Industry ===
Hutchinson supplies the industrial and mobility sectors with elastomers for a wide range of applications.

Hutchinson serves the industrial, energy and transportation markets with elastomers for a wide range of applications. They include:

- Acoustic and Vibration: vibration control parts and systems. Hutchinson’s suspension systems can be found on the Mazda 3.
- Sealing: Hutchinson develops seals, sealants, membranes, and more. These seals can be seen surrounding edges of car doors or windows, for example. Precision Sealing products such as o-rings have both automotive and industrial applications. In July 2019, Hutchinson signed a contract to supply sealing systems to Airbus and Boeing.
- Fluid and Thermal Management: Hutchinson’s Fluid Management Systems transport liquids like water, air, gas, etc. throughout a vehicle. Examples include engine cooling, fuel injection, air conditioning, braking, among others. Hutchinson’s fluid management systems can be found on the Airbus Helicopter H160.
- Material and Structure
- Power Transmission

== Global Presence ==
Hutchinson's global presence spans 26 countries, where it employs more than 40,000 people. Operations are spread around the world, serving diverse markets and customers.

Hutchinson now has three showrooms in Europe, Asia and North America. They serve as a meeting place for customers, but also as a space where employees can benefit from technology and interaction spaces.

The Fab House are located in Grand Rapids, U.S., Suzhou, China, and Châlette-sur-Loing, France. The latter has an 18th-century building designed by Gustave Eiffel. The Fab Houses are known by the nicknames: 507 Fab House, in Châlette-sur-Loing, as it is the registry number (507) on the French historical places. The 616 Fab House in Grand Rapids, as the 616 is the Grand Rapids area code.

== Research ==
Hutchinson is involved in multi-materials, composites, system characterization, mechatronics and connected systems, and multi-physics modeling. The Group has three research and innovation centers in France, the United States and Singapore.

It also has partnerships with companies, where it develops dynamic wireless charging for electric vehicles. The technology allows vehicles to charge while driving via coils embedded in the roadway. Electrive explains, “The coils are embedded eight centimetres below the surface, invisible to road users, and only activated when a vehicle drives over them.” Hutchinson manufactures these coils. Electreon participated in a pilot project for the Swedish Transport Administration electric road program where Electreon embedded its technology in a one-mile stretch of road on the island of Gotland. The Group also have partnerships with universities such as the University of Singapore and the University of Michigan.

The Group has a history of creating products to reduce carbon dioxide emissions. The company participates in European Commission funded research initiatives such as Clean Sky, the goal of which is to reduce the impact of air travel on the environment. Hutchinson is the coordinator of two Clean Sky 2 projects focusing on air treatment and temperature control in aircraft. In 2017, the company hosted a student research competition in the 507 Fab House.

== Major acquisitions ==
Hutchinson has acquired many companies with varying expertise. In 1974 Hutchinson acquired Paulstra, a company which specializes in vibration and acoustic insulation.

In United States Hutchinson acquired in 1996 the Corduroy Rubber Company in Grand Rapids, MI, calling for many years Paustra CRC and later only Hutchinson. In 1998 acquired the National O-Rings in Downey, CA and Stillman Seal in Carlsbad, CA.

The company made multiple acquisitions in 2019. In January, Hutchinson announced the acquisition of an American parts manufacturer called Midé Technology.

In September, Hutchinson acquired a thermal management company called TCSA from Mann+Hummel. “TCSA is now a joint venture between the two companies, dedicated to thermal management and cooling systems for vehicles, particularly EV and HEV and integrated in Hutchinson’s FMS (Fluid Management Systems) activity.”

Later that month, Hutchinson announced its acquisition of German aerospace company, PFW. The acquisition was completed in January 2020.

In February 2026, Hutchinson announced the acquisition of Cox & Co Company (a U.S. leader in low‑power de‑icing solutions) and its subsidiary Prime Technology (a U.S. expert in naval and industrial instrumentation), further strengthening its position as a Tier‑1 strategic partner in the aerospace sector.
