= Hunter Boot Ltd =

British footwear manufacturer

Hunter Boot Limited
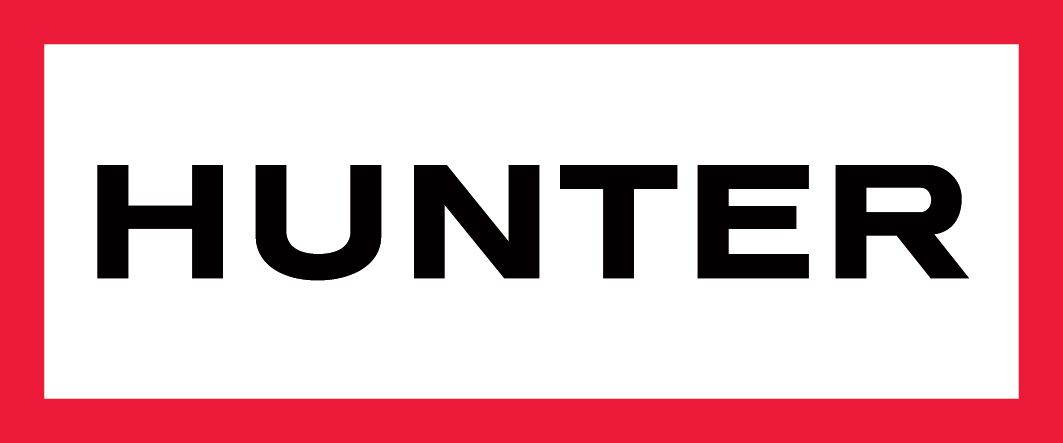
- Formerly: North British Rubber Company
- Type: Private
- Industry: Footwear
- Founded: 1856; 170 years ago
- Founder: Henry Lee Norris
- Headquarters: Edinburgh, Scotland
- Products: Wellington boots, other footwear and accessories
- Owner: Pall Mall Legacy (majority)
- Website: hunterboots.com

Hunter Boot Limited is a Scottish footwear manufacturing company that is known for its rubber Wellington boots. Originally established in 1856 as the North British Rubber Company, the firm is headquartered in Edinburgh, Scotland. It also has offices in London, New York and Düsseldorf. In addition to rubber boots and other footwear, Hunter sells products such as bags, socks and accessories. It previously made tyres, conveyor belts, combs, golf balls, hot water bottles and rubber flooring. Hunter holds several Royal Warrants as suppliers of waterproof footwear. Green Wellington boots, now manufactured in China, are its best known product.

== History ==
=== Beginnings ===
In early January 1856, Henry Lee Norris, an American entrepreneur from Jersey City, New Jersey, and his friend and partner Spencer Thomas Parmelee of New Haven, Connecticut, landed in Scotland to work a patent of Charles Goodyear for the manufacture of India-rubber overshoes and boots. They arrived in Glasgow and began by searching for a suitable factory, which they eventually found at the Castle Silk Mill in Edinburgh. A fine pair of condensing steam engines and boilers were included in the lease, which they were able to take up almost immediately due to the mill's partial occupation at the time. The pair were ready to begin operations in the midsummer of 1856. Originally, the company was named Norris & Co., which existed until the first limited liability act was introduced to Great Britain. The North British Rubber Company (which much later became known as Hunter Boot Limited) was registered as a limited liability company in September 1857.

Norris was eventually succeeded at the company by William Erskine Bartlett, who arguably invented what is considered to be the accepted type of car tyre today. Around 1907, the fledgling British Dunlop tyre company bought the 'Bartlett' patent from the North British Rubber Company for US$973,000, in order to acquire the rights to manufacture and distribute tyres under the same name. It is estimated that, today, the patent would be worth more than US$200,000,000.

The company made not only rubber boots but also tyres, conveyors, combs, golf balls, hot water bottles and rubber flooring. In the beginning, there were only four people working for the company; by 1875, the team had grown to 600. The company had offices in Edinburgh, London and New York.

=== Wartime production ===
Production of Wellington boots was dramatically boosted with the advent of World War I, when the company was asked by the War Office to construct a sturdy boot suitable for the conditions in flooded trenches. The mills ran day and night to produce immense quantities of these trench boots. In total, 1,185,036 pairs were made to cope with the Army's demands. The Wellington boot was envied by German soldiers during World War I and its dependability was seen to contribute to the British army's success.

For World War II, the company was again called upon to supply vast quantities of Wellington and thigh boots. Eighty per cent of production was for war materials - from ground sheets to life belts and gas masks. In the Netherlands, forces were working in flooded conditions which demanded Wellingtons and tight boots in vast supplies.

By the end of the war, the Wellington had become popular among men, women and children for wear in wet weather. It had become far roomier with a thick sole and rounded toe. Also, with the rationing of that time, labourers began to use them for daily work.

=== Post-war period ===
After World War II, boot making had to move to a larger factory in Heathhall, Dumfries, to deal with the rise in demand. The factory was originally built for Arrol-Johnston (later Arrol-Aster), a Scottish automobile manufacturer, in 1913, before the company was liquidated in 1931. This is said to be the first car factory in Britain to use ferro-concrete (concrete reinforced with metal bars), and was designed by Albert Kahn.

The company's most famous Wellington, the "Original Green Wellington", was first made in the winter of 1955. It was the first orthopaedic boot made by Hunter, and was launched alongside the Royal Hunter - another boot that remained in Hunter's range in 2012. Reaction from trade was slow, and an order of 36 pairs considered an achievement. However, the company persisted, taking them to county shows and trade fairs. Thought of as more up-market than the traditional black Wellington of the time, the 'Original' tended at first to be worn by middle- to upper-class rural people, who are still sometimes referred to as the 'Green Welly Brigade'.

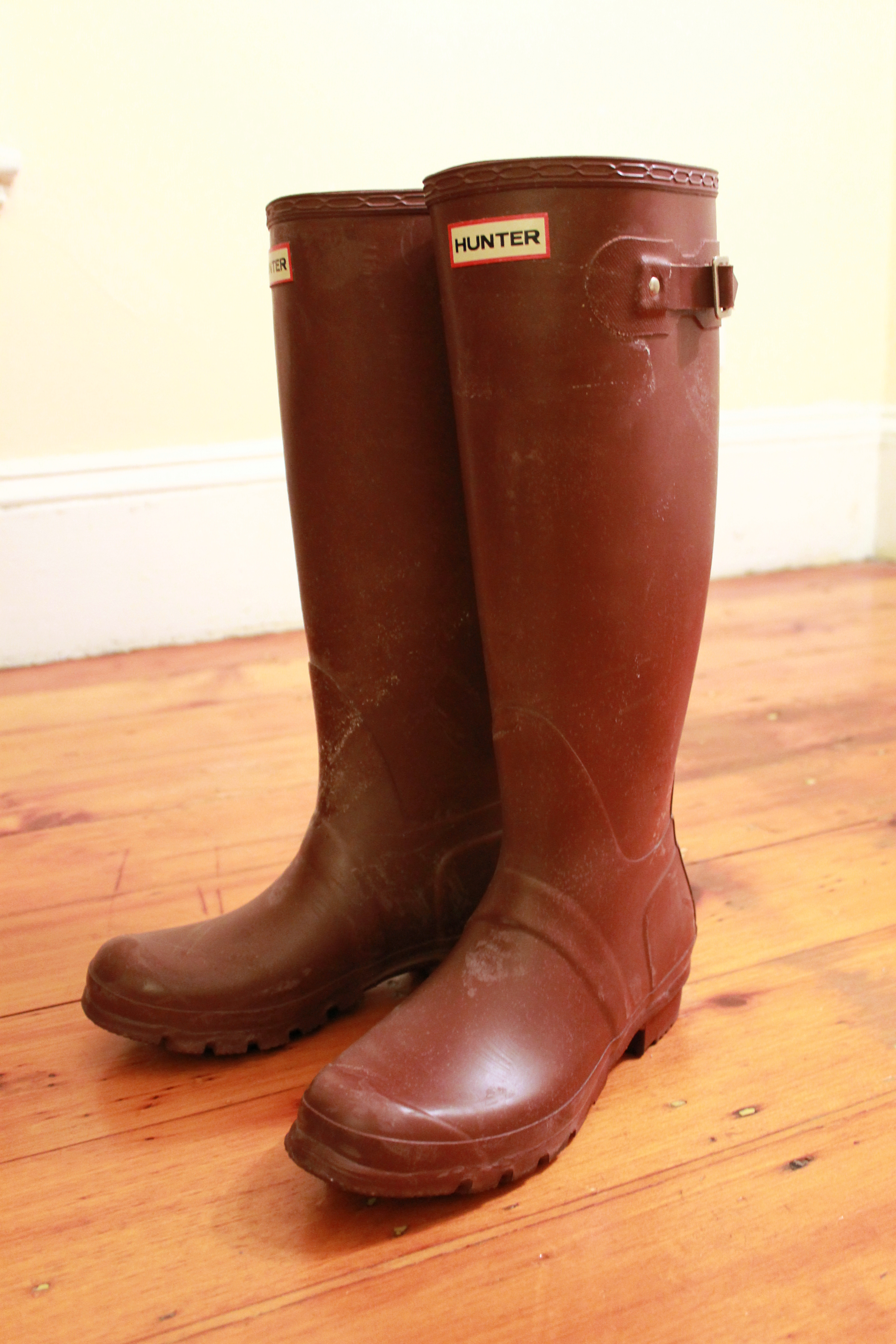
A pair of Hunter 'Original Tall' Wellington boots.

=== 1966–2005: ownership changes ===
In 1966, North British Rubber was bought by Uniroyal Limited of Greenville, South Carolina. Formerly known as the U.S. Rubber Company, Uniroyal is best known for car tyres and still operates today. In 1976, having continued to supply boots to the royal households, Hunter was awarded a Royal Warrant from the Duke of Edinburgh. This was shortly followed by another from the Queen in 1986. By this time, a pair of Hunter boots had become an essential item for those guided in upmarket country fashion. By the end of the 1980s, they were synonymous with the much caricatured figures of the Sloane Ranger Handbook.

In 1986, Uniroyal was bought by the Gates Rubber Company of Denver, Colorado. From the beginning of 1987, the company was known under the name of its new owner. It entered the drysuit market shortly after the takeover by Gates, at its peak becoming the number two producer in the market with a 35% market share. Its fortunes continued to improve over the next ten years until, in 1996, Gates Corporation, formerly known as The Gates Rubber Company, became a wholly owned subsidiary of Tomkins plc, ending 85 years of ownership by the Gates family. Tomkins paid a reported £366m for the stake. At that time, Gates was the largest non-tyre rubber company in the world.

Intent on strengthening its positions in its core engineering markets, Tomkins began to dispose of a number of businesses during the period 1998-2001. In 1999, it sold the Consumer and Industrial Division of The Gates Rubber Company to Interfloor, the country's largest carpet underlay manufacturer. The company became the Hunter Division of Interfloor.

In early 2004, a management-led investor group acquired the Hunter Boots business of Interfloor Group Ltd for £1.98m in a leveraged buyout transaction. For the first time, Hunter became an independent company under its own name, specifically, the Hunter Rubber Company.

At the end of 2004, Hunter announced that they would be releasing a range of seven different coloured Wellingtons to celebrate the 50th anniversary of the Green Wellington Boot. Each different coloured boot, along with the kids' range, represented one of eight charities and were used to raise funds for them. The company launched a dedicated website, www.giving-welly.co.uk, to this purpose, and raised over £250,000 for charity.

Hunter launched several extensions to the Wellington range in mid-2005. Along with developing boots under licence for the Royal Horticultural Society, the Lady Northampton riding boot, combining a moulded waterproof rubber and canvas upper, was also added to extend from the company's traditional all-rubber Wellington boot range.

=== 2006: administration and buy-out ===
In 2006, the Hunter Rubber Company was placed into administration due to cash flow problems. In spite of a reported turnover of over £5m, accountants from KPMG said the firm suffered from high manufacturing costs, including fuel costs, and made a loss from the expansion of its business to the United States. According to documents filed with Companies House, Hunter reported a loss of £600,000 from September 2003 to the end of February 2005, when it had a net debt of £2.03m.

A private consortium led by Lord Marland of Odstock and comprising Peter Mullen, ex CEO of Thomas Pink, and Julian Taylor, all of whom were previous shareholders in Hunter Rubber Company, supported by the Pentland Group plc, bought Hunter out of administration and Hunter Boot Ltd was born. After rapid re-structuring of the company, new supply routes and distribution partners were found in the UK and USA and the Hunter portfolio was rationalised to core products exhibiting the key skills and tradition of the company.

Hunter regained a large market share of the traditional country and leisure footwear market in the UK after the buy-out, and positioned itself as a strong contender in the USA - opening showrooms on 7th Avenue in New York and Regent Street in London. A new management team retained many of the staff from Hunter Rubber.

In November 2006, Hunter Diving Ltd - the arm of Hunter Rubber that was responsible for manufacturing drysuits - was sold to Swedish rival company Trelleborg Group for an undisclosed sum.

=== 2007–present ===
Spring 2007 saw the relationship between Hunter and the Royal Horticultural Society further strengthened by the launch of a new range of RHS boots at the Chelsea Flower Show in London in May. Hunter also set up the 'Century' Division to handle its global range of safety boots, and to develop new products in this sector. A little over a year later, Century Safety was acquired by the Tigar Corporation for an undisclosed sum.

Hunter Boot Ltd enjoyed a record season in summer 2007 announcing, in August, an 85% sales increase against the same period in 2006 Despite this, Hunter remained faced with major financial challenges regarding production. High manufacturing and fuel costs that contributed to the company's move into administration in 2006 remained prominent and, like many UK manufacturing businesses, Hunter was forced to consider whether it was worth manufacturing in the UK. The company also had to negotiate a volatile relationship with its landlord and an expensive and inefficient 96-year-old factory. Eventually, alternative supply sources were sought and developed in Europe and the Far East and plans were made to leave the Dumfries plant and move the company HQ to Edinburgh. This move was finally made in September 2008. The Chinese made boots look like the original Scottish made boots apart from the addition of an internal seam. Some manufacturing efficiencies have also been made including the removal of the latex dipping process, making the boots virtually identical to those from many other manufacturers.

Hunter formed many relationships and collaborations with other brands in 2008, further extending its reach into the US, festival and fashion markets, while also contributing strongly to charity organisations. It produced versions of the classic Hunter Original boot for Jack Wills, WaterAid, Cowshed and Fortnum & Mason, as well as a trench coat designed by Suzy Radcliffe, owner of denim brand Radcliffe.

In September 2008, following the 2008 Olympics in Beijing, Hunter Boot Ltd sent specially made gold Wellington boots to every member of the Great Britain Olympic team who won a gold medal at the games.

In January 2009, Hunter announced that it would be collaborating with the fashion designer Jimmy Choo for a limited edition black Wellington boot, embossed with Jimmy Choo crocodile print and containing gold rivets and a leopard-print lining. Another boot was then launched in 2011.

The Hunter boot tooling from the Scottish factory, and the manufacturing technique, is now used in Eastern Europe (Serbia) by Tigar Footwear and the products are marketed as Century Boots.

In 2012, Searchlight Capital Partners, with headquarters in Europe and North America, became the new controlling shareholder in Hunter Boot Ltd.

In 2013, Alasdhair Willis was appointed Creative Director and two new brand categories Hunter Original and Hunter Field were introduced. The launch of Hunter Original has seen four pioneering catwalk shows at London Fashion Week showcasing new footwear, outerwear and accessories alongside the Original boot. Hunter Field is a technical collection. Introduced in SS15, a new Hunter Field logo was developed in Field Green to differentiate the two brands. The Balmoral Field boot is a technical style and features a Newflex Vibram outsole for extended use.

In 2014, Hunter opened its first global flagship on London's Regent Street. The award-winning store takes inspiration from the brand's heritage presenting the full Hunter Original, Hunter Field and Hunter Kids collections over three floors. In the same year, magician Steven Frayne, also known as Dynamo, worked with Hunter to become an integral part of their London Fashion Week show. Frayne appeared to levitate and then made models, including Suki Waterhouse, vanish in front of the crowd which included Stella McCartney and Anna Wintour. In 2015, in collaboration with Checkland Kindleysides, Hunter won Best Store Concept at the VM Excellence Awards. A second global flagship was opened in the Ginza district of Tokyo in 2016. In 2016, Hunter launched the Duke of Wellington by Hunter Field collection, a range of all-purpose equestrian outerwear and footwear. Vincent Wauters was appointed CEO. Hunter continues to be chosen by festival goers the world over, and is particularly synonymous with the mud-filled Glastonbury Festival. Kate Moss first wore her Original Tall boots to Glastonbury in 2005, while recent years have seen Alexa Chung in the Original Chelsea Boot, Cara Delevingne wearing the Original Backpack and Niall Horan in Hunter Original outerwear.

In 2016, Hunter launched its Core collection, a range of weatherproof Hunter boots in an array of colours. "Rain Starts Play" was coined as a hashtag for the launch.

In June 2023 Hunter Boot went into administration owing creditors £112.8 million. The administrator stated, that the company had been on a decline as a result of reduced demand in combination with the pandemic, supply chain disruption and inflation. On 30 June 2023 Hunter Boot filed for creditor protection under the Companies' Creditors Arrangement Act in Canada.

== In popular culture ==
The stage play Sweet F.A. dramatized the real-life women's association football club formed during World War I by the company's workers in its Fountainbridge, Edinburgh factory. The play was performed at the 2021 Edinburgh Festival Fringe festival on a stage built on the main stand of Tynecastle Park.

== See also ==
- Mackintosh (brand)
- Gumboot Day
- William's Wish Wellingtons
