= Sema Sgaier =

Libyan molecular biologist

- Born: 1975 (age 50–51); Tripoli, Libya
- Occupations: Scientist, Global Health expert, Documentary photographer

Sema K. Sgaier (born 1975) is an Arab American scientist, global health expert, and documentary photographer. She is the co-founder and CEO of Surgo Health, a health technology company developing a social-behavioral analytics platform to improve healthcare outcomes. Sgaier's expertise includes molecular biology, genetics, genomics, neuroscience, epidemiology, disease surveillance, monitoring & evaluation of programs and policy development.

Sgaier was an assistant adjunct professor at the Harvard T. H. Chan School of Public Health and an affiliate assistant professor of global health at the University of Washington. While she was working for the Bill & Melinda Gates Foundation she and Mala Gaonkar co-founded the Surgo Foundation to better understand how data and behavior can influence public health outcomes. In 2020, she and Gaonkar co-founded Surgo Ventures, leveraging artificial intelligence and behavioral science to solve global health problems.

She was selected as a Rising Talent by the Women's Forum for the Economy & Society. She is a Board Member of the United States of Care and the Bill & Melinda Gates Foundation Alumni Advisory Board. She is also a frequent OpEd contributor to media outlets such as the New York Times, USA Today, and U.S. News & World Report.

== Early life ==
Sgaier was born in 1975 in Tripoli, Libya to a Libyan father and Turkish mother. Sgaier studied molecular biology and genetics at Boğaziçi University in Istanbul, Turkey, where she graduated with her Bachelor of Science in 2005, ranking first of her class. Sgaier later obtained her Masters in Art in neuroscience from Brown University in 1999 and Masters in Science and Doctorate of Philosophy (PhD) in cellular and molecular biology (Developmental Genetics) in 2005 from New York University. She conducted her postdoctoral training in human genomics in the lab of Dr. Christopher A. Walsh at Beth Israel Deaconess Medical Center at Harvard Medical School.

Sgaier is the recipient of New York University, Brown University fellowships and Beth Israel Deaconess Medical Center fellowships.

Sgaier studied Documentary Photography at the International Center of Photography.

== Career ==
Sgaier was the first to fine tune and apply the technique of Genetic Inducible Fate Mapping (GIFM) to understand how the complex 3D cerebellum develops from early-undifferentiated neuronal cells of the anterior hindbrain. With Tim Yu and colleagues, she discovered that mutations in the gene WDR62 causes microcephaly.

At the Center for Global Health Research, Sgaier designed and developed the Sample Registration Health Check-Up Survey to study the underlying risk factors of various diseases in India. She has published on the epidemiology of HIV and sexually transmitted diseases.

From 2008, Sema was a Program Officer with the Bill & Melinda Gates Foundation. She led a portfolio on voluntary medical male circumcision for HIV prevention across eastern and southern Africa. As part of BMGF's India Country Office, Sema led the scale-up of the foundation's HIV prevention program (Avahan) in several states, managed its transition to the government of India, and developed data platforms for decision-making. She worked closely with the Indian National AIDS Control Program to assist in the design of their program and strengthen their analytic efforts.

She, Mala Gaonkar, and Malcolm Gladwell, co-founded the Surgo Foundation. They invested in public health projects, by listening to local needs. She founded Surgo Health.

== Selected publications ==
=== Articles (selected) ===
- Sgaier, Sema K.; Millet, Sandrine; Villanueva, Melissa P.; Berenshteyn, Frada; Song, Christian; Joyner, Alexandra L. (2005). "Morphogenetic and Cellular Movements that Shape the Mouse Cerebellum". Neuron. 45 (1): 27–40. doi:10.1016/j.neuron.2004.12.021. PMID 15629700. S2CID 17199408.
- Atit, Radhika; Sgaier, Sema K.; Mohamed, Othman A.; Taketo, Makoto M.; Dufort, Daniel; Joyner, Alexandra L.; Niswander, Lee; Conlon, Ronald A. (2006). "Βeta-catenin activation is necessary and sufficient to specify the dorsal dermal fate in the mouse". Developmental Biology. 296 (1): 164–76. doi:10.1016/j.ydbio.2006.04.449. PMID 16730693.
- Sgaier, S. K.; Lao, Z.; Villanueva, M. P.; Berenshteyn, F.; Stephen, D.; Turnbull, R. K.; Joyner, A. L. (2007). "Genetic subdivision of the tectum and cerebellum into functionally related regions based on differential sensitivity to engrailed proteins". Development. 134 (12): 2325–35. doi:10.1242/dev.000620. PMC 2840613. PMID 17537797.
- Chen, Li; Jha, Prabhat; Stirling, Bridget; Sgaier, Sema K.; Daid, Tina; Kaul, Rupert; Nagelkerke, Nico; International Studies of HIV/AIDS (ISHA) Investigators (2007). Siegfried, Nandi (ed.). "Sexual Risk Factors for HIV Infection in Early and Advanced HIV Epidemics in Sub-Saharan Africa: Systematic Overview of 68 Epidemiological Studies". PLOS ONE. 2 (10) e1001. Bibcode:2007PLoSO...2.1001C. doi:10.1371/journal.pone.0001001. PMC 1994584. PMID 17912340.
- Sgaier, S. K.; Jha, P.; Mony, P.; Kurpad, A.; Lakshmi, V.; Kumar, R.; Ganguly, N. K. (2007). "Public Health: Biobanks in Developing Countries: Needs and Feasibility". Science. 318 (5853): 1074–5. doi:10.1126/science.1149157. PMID 18006727. S2CID 166785291.
- Yu, Timothy W; Mochida, Ganeshwaran H; Tischfield, David J; Sgaier, Sema K; Flores-Sarnat, Laura; Sergi, Consolato M; Topçu, Meral; McDonald, Marie T; et al. (2010). "Mutations in WDR62, encoding a centrosome-associated protein, cause microcephaly with simplified gyri and abnormal cortical architecture". Nature Genetics. 42 (11): 1015–20. doi:10.1038/ng.683. PMC 2969850. PMID 20890278.
- Sgaier, S. K.; Mony, P.; Jayakumar, S.; McLaughlin, C.; Arora, P.; Kumar, R.; Bhatia, P.; Jha, P. (2010). "Prevalence and correlates of Herpes Simplex Virus-2 and syphilis infections in the general population in India". Sexually Transmitted Infections. 87 (2): 94–100. doi:10.1136/sti.2010.043687. PMID 21059842. S2CID 8556425.
- Sgaier, S.K.; Anthony, J; Bhattacharjee, P; Baer, J; Malve, V; Bhalla, A; Hugar, VS (2014). "Strengthening government management capacity to scale up HIV prevention programs through the use of Technical Support Units: lessons from Karnataka state, India". Glob Health Sci Pract. 2 (4): 444–58. doi:10.9745/GHSP-D-14-00141. PMC 4307860. PMID 25611478.
- Sgaier, S.K.; Reed, JB; Thomas, A; Njeuhmeli, E (2014). "Achieving the HIV Prevention Impact of Voluntary Medical Male Circumcision: Lessons and Challenges for Managing Programs". PLOS Med. 11 (5) e1001641. doi:10.1371/journal.pmed.1001641. PMC 4011573. PMID 24800840.
- Sgaier, S.K.; Baer, J; Rutz, DC; Njeuhmeli, E; Seifert-Ahanda, A; Basinga, P; Parkyn, R; Laube, C. (2015). "Toward a Systematic Approach to Generating Demand for Voluntary Medical Male Circumcision: Insights and Results From Field Studies". Glob Health Sci Pract. 3 (2): 209–229. doi:10.9745/GHSP-D-15-00020. PMC 4476860. PMID 26085019.
- Sgaier, Sema; Engl, Elisabeth; and Kretschmer, Steve. "Time to Scale Psycho-Behavioral Segmentation in Global Development". Stanford Social Innovation Review, Fall 2018.
- Sgaier, Sema K.; Engl, Elisabeth; Smittenaar, P. (2019). "Identifying population segments for effective intervention design and targeting using unsupervised machine learning: an end-to-end guide [version 2; peer review: 2 approved]". Gates Open Research. 3: 1503. doi:10.12688/gatesopenres.13029.2. PMC 6820452. PMID 31701090.

=== Book chapters ===
- "India: Scaling HIV Prevention through Partnerships – The Avahan Experience in India". with Aparajita Ramakrishnan and Ashok Alexander. in Innovative Health Partnerships: The Diplomacy of Diversity (Global Health Diplomacy: Volume 1). Daniel Low-Beer, ed. World Scientific Publishing Company, 2011. ISBN 978-981-4366-14-4
- "The Concept of Fate Through the Lens of Genetics" with F. Berenshteyn, A. L. Joyner, S. Miller, C. Song, and M. P. Villanueva in Responsive Architectures: Subtle Technologies. Philip Beesley, Sachiko Hirosue, Jim Ruxton, Camile Turner, and Marion Tränkle, ed. Cambridge: Riverside Architectural Press, 2006 pp. 26–29. ISBN 0978097807
