= Hiram Hutchinson =

American industrialist (c. 1808–1869)

Hiram Hutchinson (c. 1808–1869) was an American industrialist of British origin. In 1853 he founded a rubber company in France that was the predecessor of Hutchinson SA, a multinational industrial conglomerate. The company was sold by his family in 1898, 29 years after Hutchinson's death.

== Biography ==
Having acquired patent rights to the vulcanisation of rubber from Charles Goodyear in 1853, Hutchinson went to France to set up a mill in Châlette-sur-Loing, Loiret. He came up with the idea of producing rubber boots after he noticed that French farmers wore wooden clogs that kept them coming home with their feet wet and muddy. He then copied the design of the Duke of Wellington's Hessian boots to manufacture Wellington Boots that were cheap and waterproof, known in the UK as wellies. The boots were used extensively in WWI trenches.

Hiram spent a year in France, began manufacturing, then turned over factory management to his son, Alcander. The facility was on the site of a former royal paper mill. After WWI, it used foreign laborers. One of these was the Chinese Communist leader Deng Xiaoping, along with 214 Chinese. From 1922, he lived in a shack behind the factory.

Hutchinson returned to the United States. There he researched other rubber applications: tires; boots; sealant — all now made by Hutchinson SA.

After corporate restructuring, Hutchinson's firm still operates the plant at Châlette-sur-Loing.

Hutchinson married Mary, a Tlingit. The couple had a son, Millard, who was born c 1867.
