= Wellington boot =

Type of waterproof boot

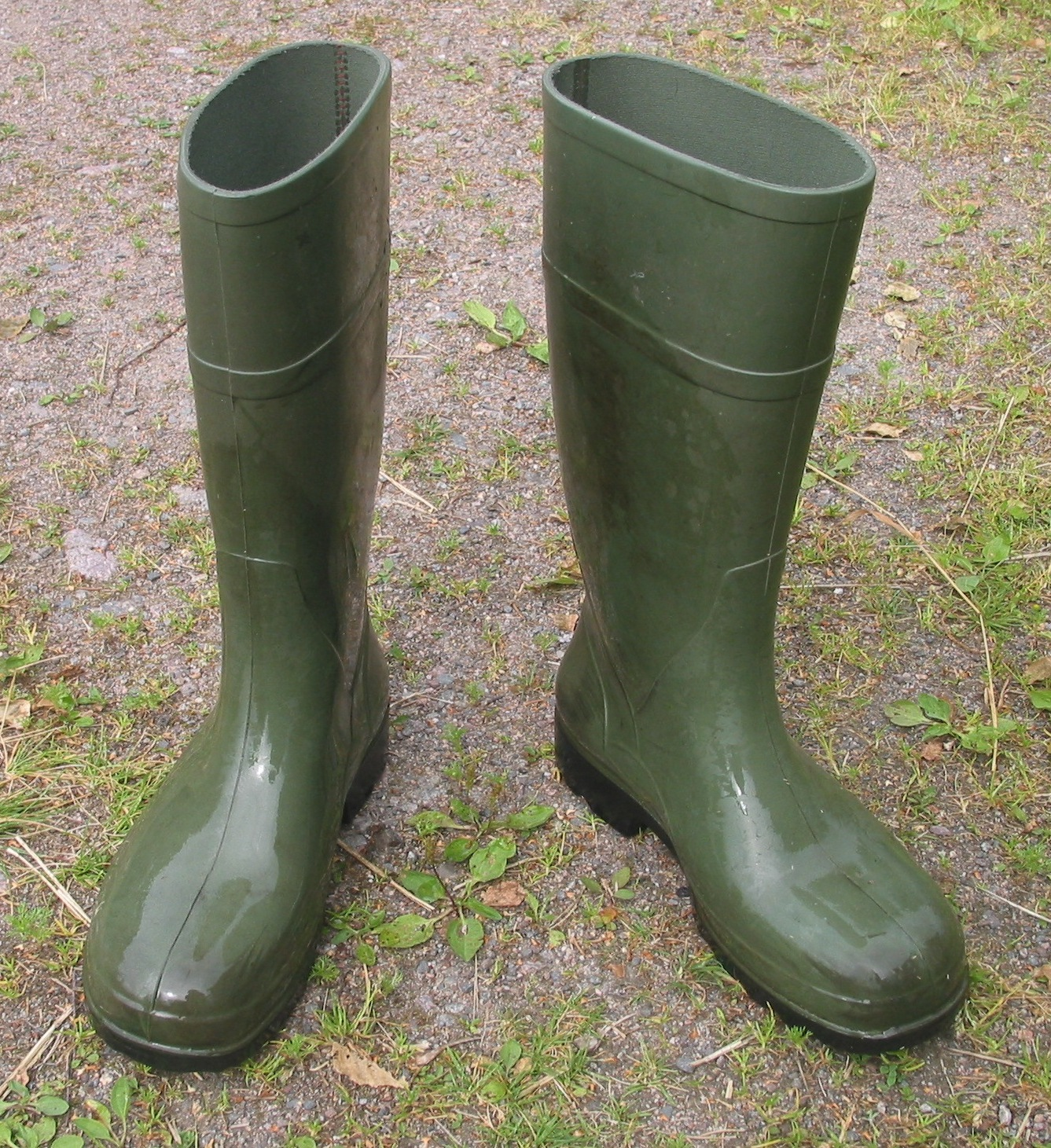
Modern polyurethane Wellington boots

A Wellington boot, gumboot, rubber boot, rain boot, rainboot, or welly for short, is a type of waterproof boot made of rubber.

Originally a type of leather riding boot adapted from Hessian boots, a style of military footwear, Wellington boots were worn and popularised by the Anglo-Irish military officer and politician Arthur Wellesley, 1st Duke of Wellington. They became a staple of practical footwear for the British aristocracy and the British middle class in the early 19th century. The term was subsequently applied to waterproof rubber boots ubiquitously worn today in a range of agricultural and outdoors pursuits.

== Names ==
The term Wellington boot comes from Arthur Wellesley, 1st Duke of Wellington, who instructed his shoemaker to create the boot by modifying the design of the Hessian boot. The terms gumboot and rubber boot are both derived from the rubber modern Wellington boots are made from, with the term "gum" coming from gum rubber.

The terms Wellington boot and gumboot are most commonly used in British English, with the term being occasionally used in American English. Instead, the terms rubber boot and rain boot are more commonly used in American English. Further, in American English, the term Wellington boot is sometimes used to specifically refer to Wellington boots with a more fashionable design.

== History ==
=== Origins ===
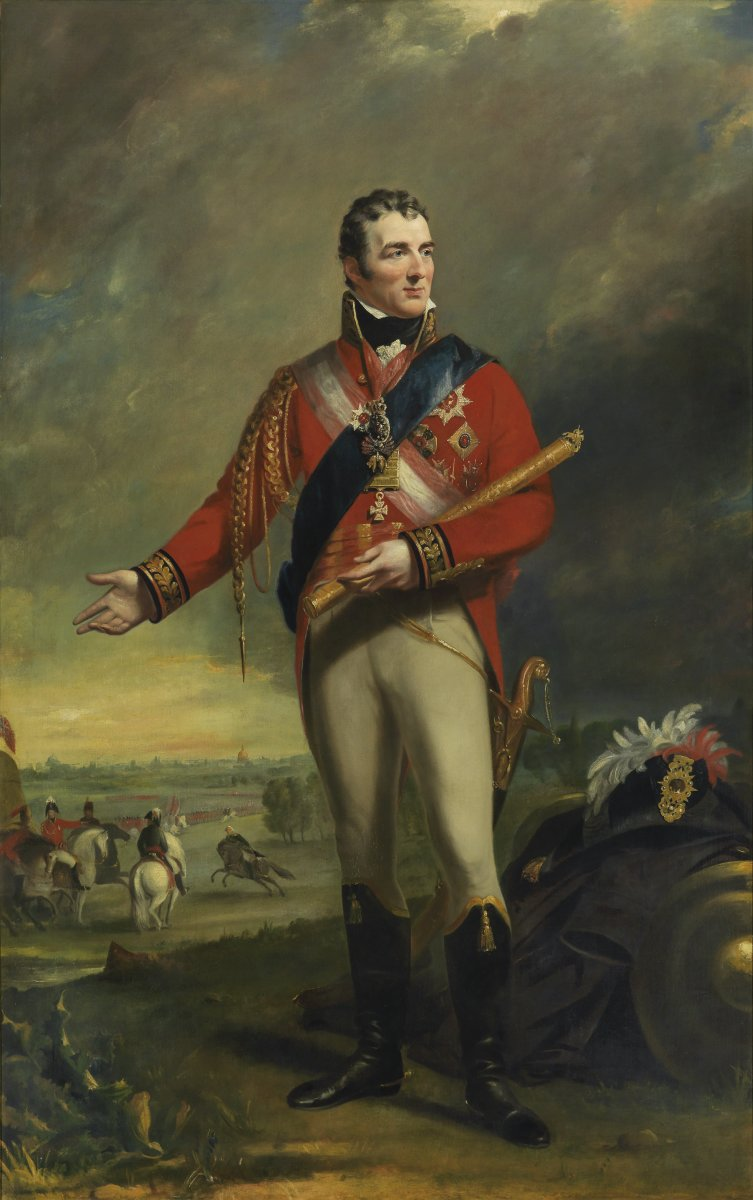
The Duke of Wellington by James Lonsdale, 1815, wearing tasselled Hessian boots

The Duke of Wellington instructed his shoemaker, Hoby of St. James's Street, London, to modify the formal 18th-century Hessian boot, shown in the 1815 portrait by James Lonsdale, recognizable by their tassel. The resulting new boot was fabricated in soft calfskin leather, had the trim removed and was cut to fit more closely around the leg. The heels were low cut, stacked around an inch (2.5 centimetres), and the boot stopped at mid-calf. It was suitably hard-wearing for riding, yet smart enough for informal evening wear. The boot was dubbed the Wellington and the name has stuck in English ever since.

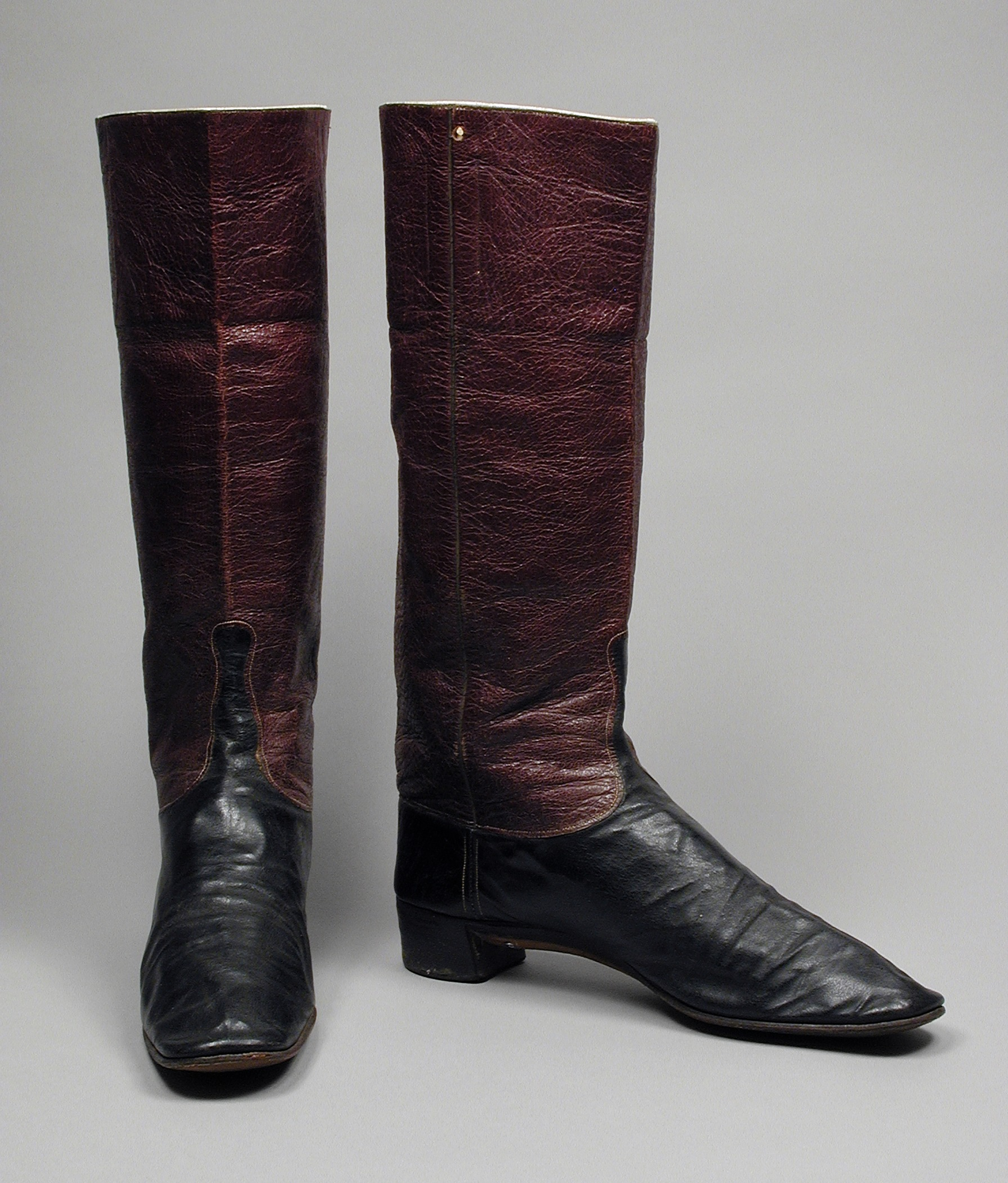
Dress Wellington boots, c. 1845

Wellington's utilitarian new boots quickly caught on with patriotic British gentlemen eager to emulate their war hero. Considered fashionable and foppish in the best circles and worn by dandies, such as Beau Brummell, they remained the main fashion for men through the 1840s. In the 1850s they were more commonly made in the calf-high version, and in the 1860s they were both superseded by the ankle boot, except for riding. Wellington is one of the two British Prime Ministers to have given his name to an item of clothing, the other being Sir Anthony Eden (see Anthony Eden hat) whilst Sir Winston Churchill gave his name to a cigar, and William Gladstone (four times prime minister between 1868 and 1894) gave his to the Gladstone Bag, the classic doctor's portmanteau.

=== World War I ===
Production of the Wellington boot was dramatically boosted with the advent of World War I and a requirement for footwear suitable for the conditions in Europe's flooded and muddy trenches. The North British Rubber Company (now Hunter Boot Ltd) was asked by the War Office to construct a boot suitable for such conditions. The mills ran day and night to produce immense quantities of these trench boots. In total, 1,185,036 pairs were made to meet the British Army's demands.

=== World War II ===
In World War II, Hunter Boot was again requested to supply vast quantities of Wellington and thigh boots. 80% of production was of war materials, from (rubber) ground sheets to life belts and gas masks. In the Netherlands, the British forces were working in flooded conditions which demanded Wellingtons and thigh boots in vast supplies.

By the end of the war in 1945, the Wellington had become popular among men, women and children for wet weather wear. The boot had developed to become far roomier with a thick sole and rounded toe. Also, with the rationing of that time, labourers began to use them for daily work.

=== Post-war ===
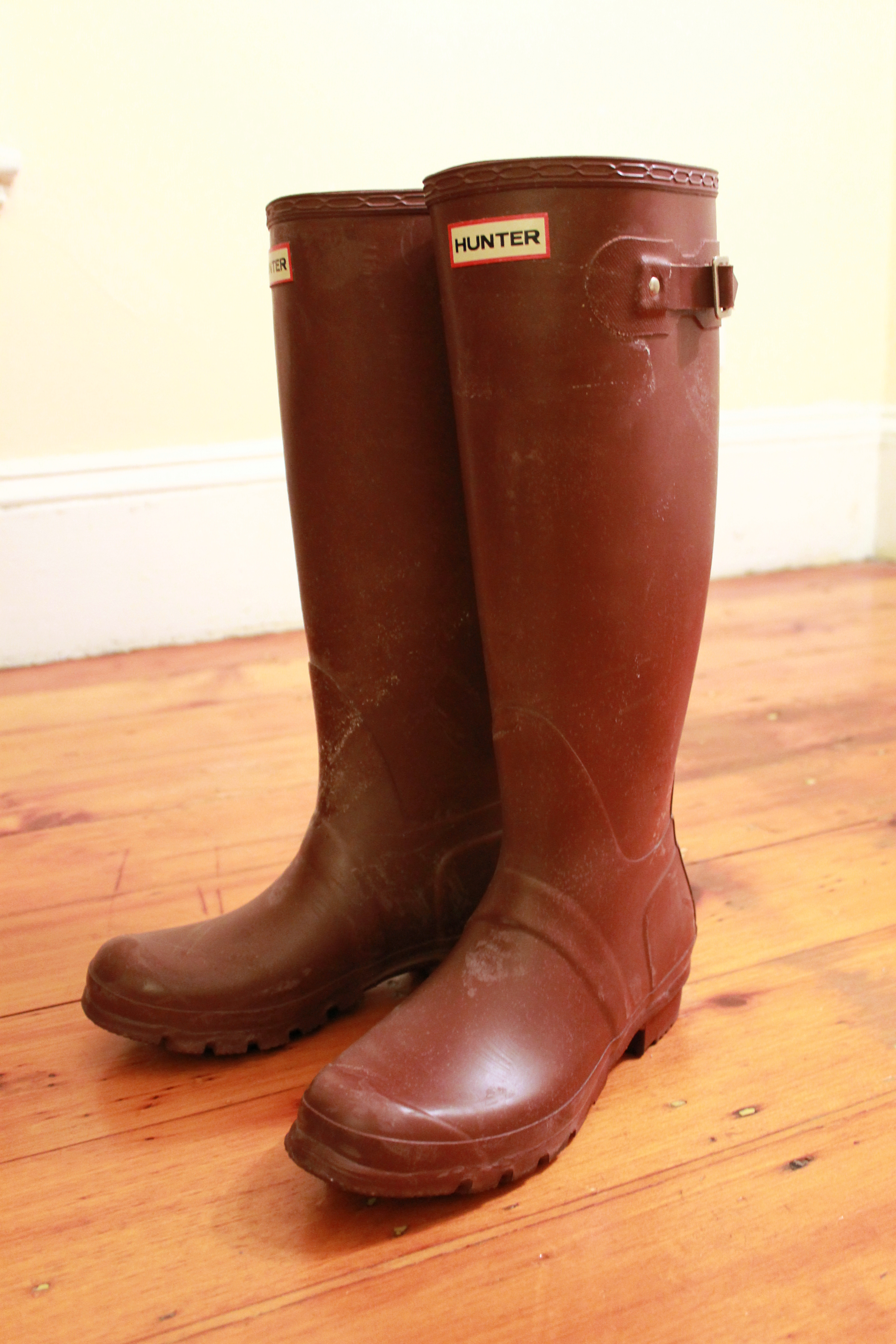
Modern Hunter natural rubber Wellington boots

The lower cost and ease of rubber "Wellington" boot manufacture, and being entirely waterproof, lent itself immediately to being the preferred protective material to leather in all forms of industry. Increased attention to occupational health and safety requirements led to the steel toe or steel-capped Wellington: a protective (commonly internal) toe-capping to protect the foot from crush and puncture injuries. Although traditionally made of steel, the reinforcement may be a composite or a plastic material such as thermoplastic polyurethane (TPU). Such steel-toe Wellingtons are nearly indispensable in an enormous range of industry and are often mandatory wear to meet local occupational health and safety legislation or insurance requirements.

In July 1956, the Monopolies and Restrictive Practices Commission published its Report on the Supply of Certain Rubber Footwear, which covered rubber boots of all kinds including Wellingtons and overboots. This 107-page official publication addressed contemporary concerns about unfair pricing of rubber footwear manufactured in the UK or imported from overseas. The appendices include lists of rubber footwear manufacturers and price-lists of each company's range of Wellington boots available in the mid-1950s.

Green Wellington boots, introduced by Hunter Boot Ltd in 1955, gradually became a shorthand for "country life" in the UK. In 1980, sales of their boots skyrocketed after Lady Diana Spencer (future Princess Diana) was pictured wearing a pair on the Balmoral estate during her courtship with Prince Charles.

The boots are synonymous with the Glastonbury festival, due to both their practical use and their place in fashion trends.

== Construction ==
Wellington boots were at first made of leather. However, in 1852 Hiram Hutchinson met Charles Goodyear, who had just invented the sulfur vulcanisation process for natural rubber. Hutchinson bought the patent to manufacture footwear and moved to France to establish À l'Aigle ("At the Eagle") in 1853, to honour his home country. Today the company is simply called Aigle. In a country where 95% of the population were working on fields with wooden clogs as they had been for generations, the introduction of the wholly waterproof, Wellington-type rubber boot became an instant success: farmers would be able to come back home with clean, dry feet.

== Design ==
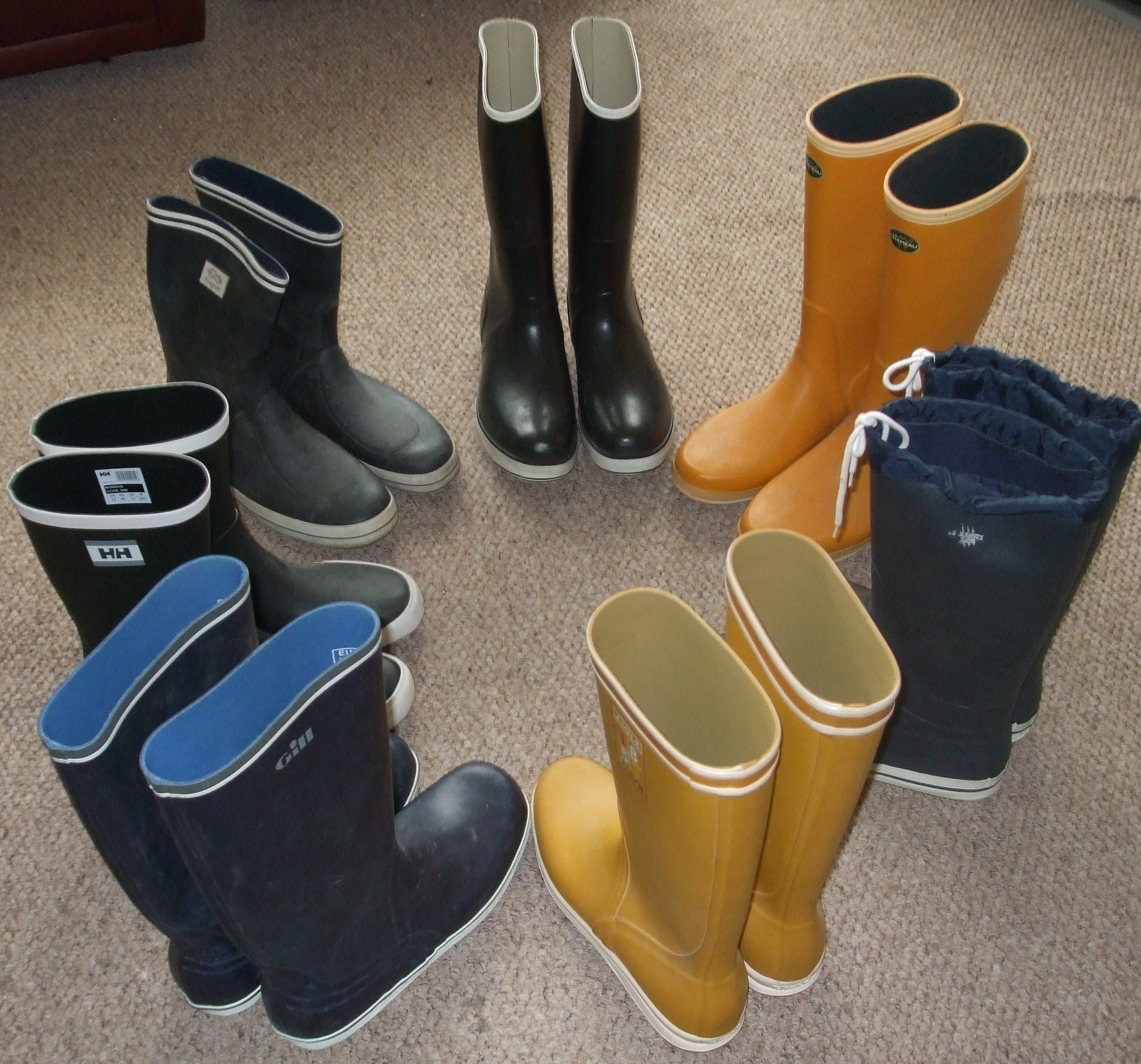
Clockwise from top: Sperry Top-Sider, Le Chameau, Jeantex, Aigle, Gill, Helly-Hansen and Newport short and tall rubber sailing Wellingtons

Wellington boots in contemporary usage are waterproof and are most often made from rubber or polyvinyl chloride (PVC), a halogenated polymer. They are usually worn when walking on wet or muddy ground, or to protect the wearer from heavy showers and puddles.

They are generally just below knee-high although shorter boots are available. British Standard 5145 tabulates minimum heights for rubber boots thus.

Type	Men's mm	Women's mm
Ankle	135	135
Half knee	190	190
Short knee	275	260
Knee	350	300
Three quarter thigh	660	–
Full thigh	720	–

== Use ==
The primary use of rainboots is for foot protection on rainy days.

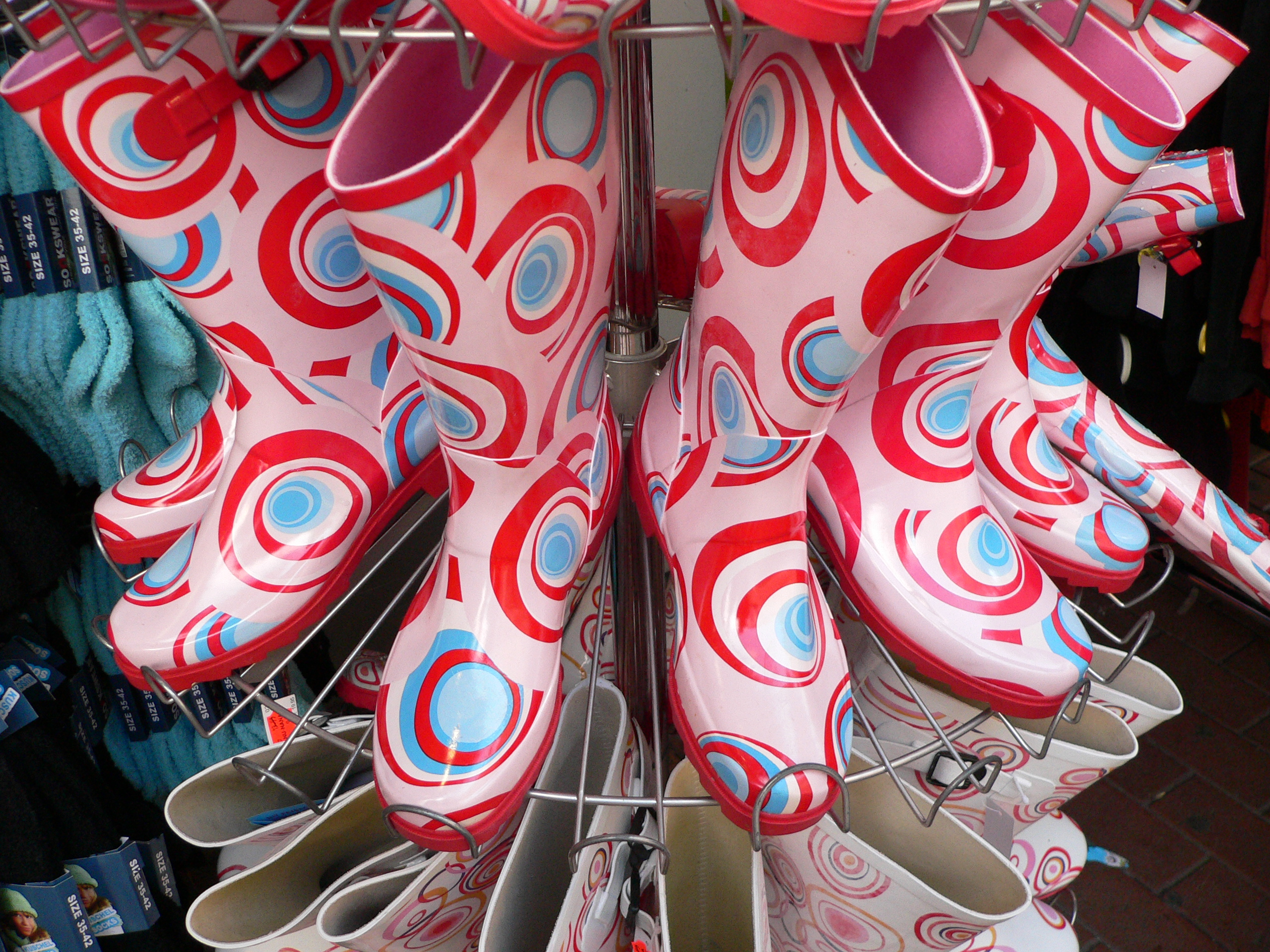
Colourful printed rubber Wellingtons

Before its entry into the mobile phone business, rubber boots were among the best-known products of Nokia.

Rubber work boots, often with integrated toe protection, are frequently worn by professionals who work in wet and muddy conditions, such as construction workers, plumbers, farmers, fishermen and more.

Both the Finnish Defence Forces and the Swedish Armed Forces issue rubber boots to all soldiers for use in wet conditions and during the winter with felt liners.

== Cultural impact ==
Gebhard Leberecht von Blücher was Wellington's colleague at the Battle of Waterloo and there is speculation that some early emigrants to Australia, remembering the battle, may have confused a different design the Blucher shoe developed by Blucher. The Australian poet Henry Lawson wrote a poem to a pair of Blucher Boots in 1890.

The boots are a key plot device in British author Jilly Cooper's children's book Little Mabel Saves the Day.

== See also ==
- List of boots
- List of shoe styles
- British country clothing
- Galoshes
- Mackintosh (raincoat)
- Paddington Bear
- Vermin Supreme
- Waders (footwear)
- William's Wish Wellingtons
- Welly wanging
