= Mala Gaonkar =

American businesswoman

- Born: Mala Gopal Gaonkar; November 1969 (age 56); United States
- Education: Harvard College; Harvard Business School
- Occupation: Businesswoman
- Title: Investor, SurgoCap Partners LP
- Spouse(s): Oliver Haarmann (divorced) David Byrne (m. 2025)
- Children: 2

Mala Gopal Gaonkar (born November 1969) is an American businesswoman, former portfolio manager at investment firm Lone Pine Capital, and the head of investment firm SurgoCap Partners.

== Early life and education ==
Gaonkar was born in November 1969 in the U.S. but mostly raised in Bengaluru, India. She attended Spanish River High School in Boca Raton, Florida, graduating in 1987. She earned a degree from Harvard College in 1991, then an MBA from Harvard Business School in 1996.

== Career ==
After graduating from Harvard College, she worked for Boston Consulting Group and completed her MBA at Harvard Business School. She briefly worked as an analyst at Chase Capital Partners before joining Lone Pine Capital as a founding partner in 1998. Gaonkar worked there as a portfolio manager for 23 years.

In 2015, Gaonkar founded the Surgo Foundation alongside Sema Sgaier, a veteran of the Gates Foundation, and the author Malcolm Gladwell. The foundation focused on the use of AI and data science to solve public health problems like sanitation issues in India. In 2020, Gaonkar expanded the idea to Surgo Ventures, which developed partnerships with similar groups seeking to help solve global health issues.

In 2022, she left Lone Pine Capital and started SurgoCap Partners, a hedge fund which was launched in January 2023, managing $1.8 billion. This was the largest-ever debut of a hedge fund run by a woman.

By 2024, SurgoCap had grown its assets to over $3 billion. The fund's diverse portfolio includes major tech stocks like Nvidia, along with significant holdings in companies such as healthcare conglomerate McKesson and energy firm GE Vernova. Additionally, SurgoCap participated in Figma's fundraising round in 2024, following the collapse of Figma's acquisition by Adobe in late 2023.

As an author, she collaborated with David Byrne in 2016 to create a guided immersive theater performance, "Theater of the Mind".

She is a published short story writer and was nominated for a Pushcart Prize.

She is a member of the boards of directors of Surgo Ventures and Surgo Health and a trustee of Tate Foundation and the Queen Elizabeth Prize for Engineering. She previously served as a trustee of Ariadne Labs, Clinton Health Access Initiative (CHAI), RAND, and as a member of Harvard's Global Advisory Council.

== Personal life ==
Gaonkar is married to the musician David Byrne, whom she began dating in 2016 and with whom she has collaborated on several artistic projects. Gaonkar was formerly married to Oliver Haarmann with whom she has two sons. Gaonkar has taken The Giving Pledge.
