= The ClementJames Centre =

UK education charity

Coordinates: 51.5119°N 0.2153°W

- Founded: 1992
- Type: Registered Charity
- Registration no.: 1009253
- Location: Sirdar Road, London, W11, UK
- Region served: North Kensington
- Key people: Clare Richards MBE FRSA (Chief Executive)
- Revenue: GBP £1,091,724 (2019)
- Website: clementjames.org

The ClementJames Centre is a UK education charity based in North Kensington, one of London's most disadvantaged areas.

The charity's main message is that anyone has the potential to achieve their goals and succeed in life. By providing tailored support around education, employment, and wellbeing it breaks down barriers and empowers people to release their full potential.

== Adult programmes ==
Adult Learning: Support for adults to improve their English, this includes ESOL (English for Speakers of Other Languages), Functional Skills English, basic skills, and advice and guidance to adults with English as a second language. The Adult Learning programme also offers basic skills courses for English native speakers in Maths and ICT.

Employment Support: The Employment Support programme is designed to break the cycle of generations of unemployment in the local population. Its mission is to enable unemployed adults and young people who are not in education, work or training to find secure employment with good pay and conditions. The centre provides qualifications, career coaching, job preparation and job application support, as well as outreach in schools, colleges, community centres and other voluntary organisations.

Wellbeing & Support: Impartial advice service to help users resolve their problems, ranging from housing and benefits to changing schools and accessing other services. The centre also offers activities to health and wellbeing, such as gardening sessions, reading and peer support groups, parenting workshops, and a weekly wellbeing clinic.

Literacy and Numeracy Support: Intensive one-to-one support for adults from disadvantaged backgrounds. The scheme helps adults to improve their literacy and numeracy skills to remove barriers to education and employment.

== Youth programmes ==
IntoUniversity (North Kensington): An innovative programme that supports children and young people (aged 7–18) from disadvantaged backgrounds to attain either a university place or another chosen aspiration. The centre provides sustained after-school academic support, undergraduate student and corporate mentoring, specially designed FOCUS study weeks, as well as careers workshops run by industry professionals. The programme was piloted at The ClementJames Centre in 2002. In 2007 a new charity, IntoUniversity, was launched to expand the programme nationwide.

Summer Carnival Arts: A three to four week summer holiday programme involving local children and young people in the preparations for the annual Notting Hill Carnival.

Literacy and Numeracy Support: Intensive one-to-one support for children and young people from disadvantaged backgrounds. The scheme helps children to improve their Maths and English skills, gain confidence and catch up with their peers.

== Leadership ==
The charity's Chief Executive, Clare Richards MBE FRSA, received her award for work with this charity. She is also a co-founder and Trustee of IntoUniversity.
