= Hessian (boot) =

Knee-high men's boot with a V-shaped notch and tassel at the top front

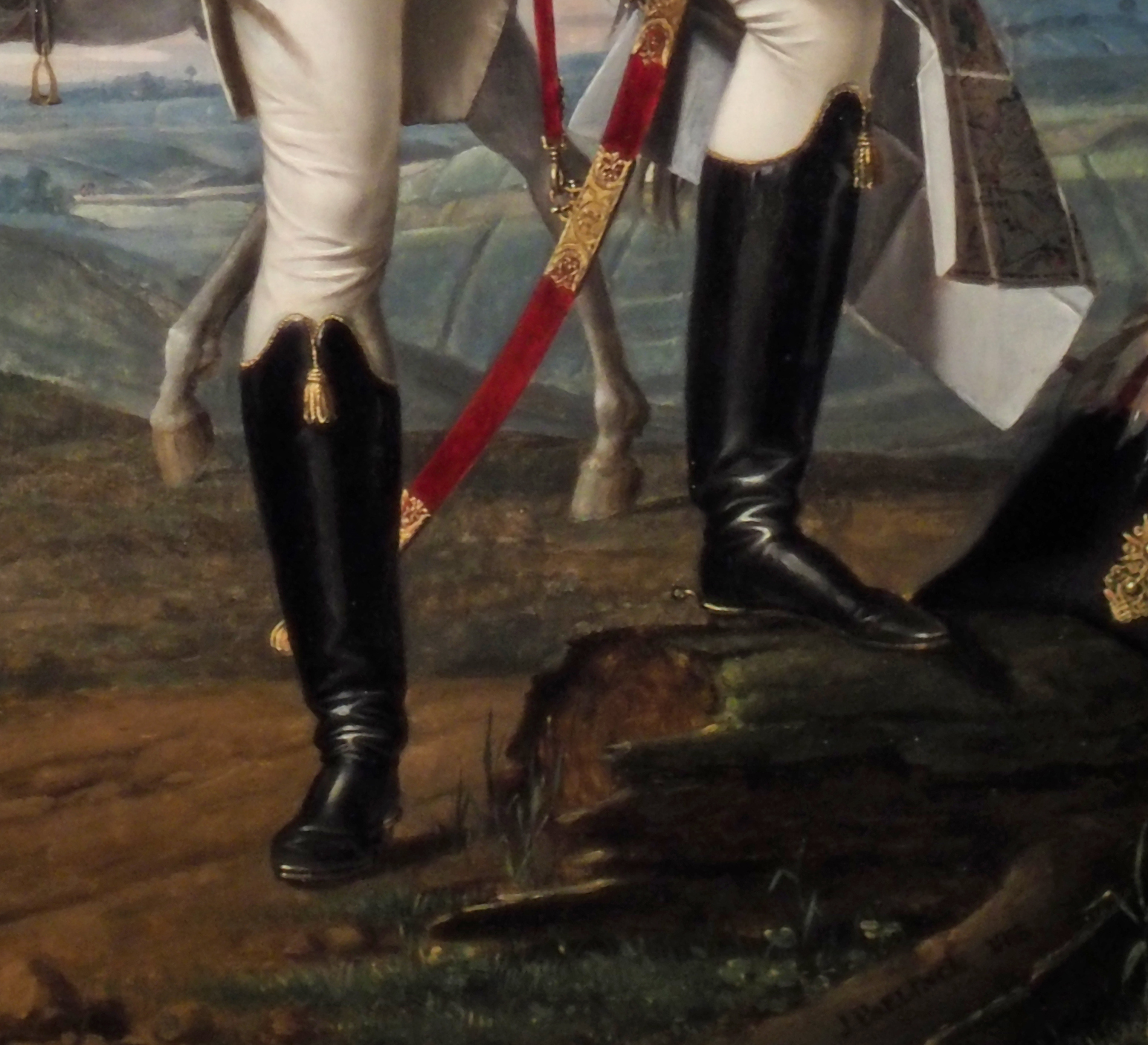
Detail of an 1818 portrait of Charles, Count Alten showing his Hessian boots

The Hessian boot (/ˈhɛsiən/; from Hesse in Germany) is a style of light riding boot that became popular from the beginning of the 19th century.

== History and description ==
First worn by German soldiers in the 18th century, these military riding boots became popular in England, particularly during the Regency period (1811–1820), with their polished leather and ornamental tassels. Initially used as standard issue footwear for light cavalry regiments, especially hussars, they became widely worn by civilians as well in both equestrian pursuits and other outdoor activities.

The boots have a low heel and a semi-pointed toe that make them practical for mounted troops, as they allow easy use of stirrups. They reach to the knee and have a decorative tassel at the top of each shaft, with a "v" notch in front. The Hessian boot evolved into the rubber work boots known as Wellington boots.

== See also ==
- Jackboot
- Hessian (soldier)
- List of boots
- List of shoe styles
