= Charles Goodyear =

American inventor (1800–1860)

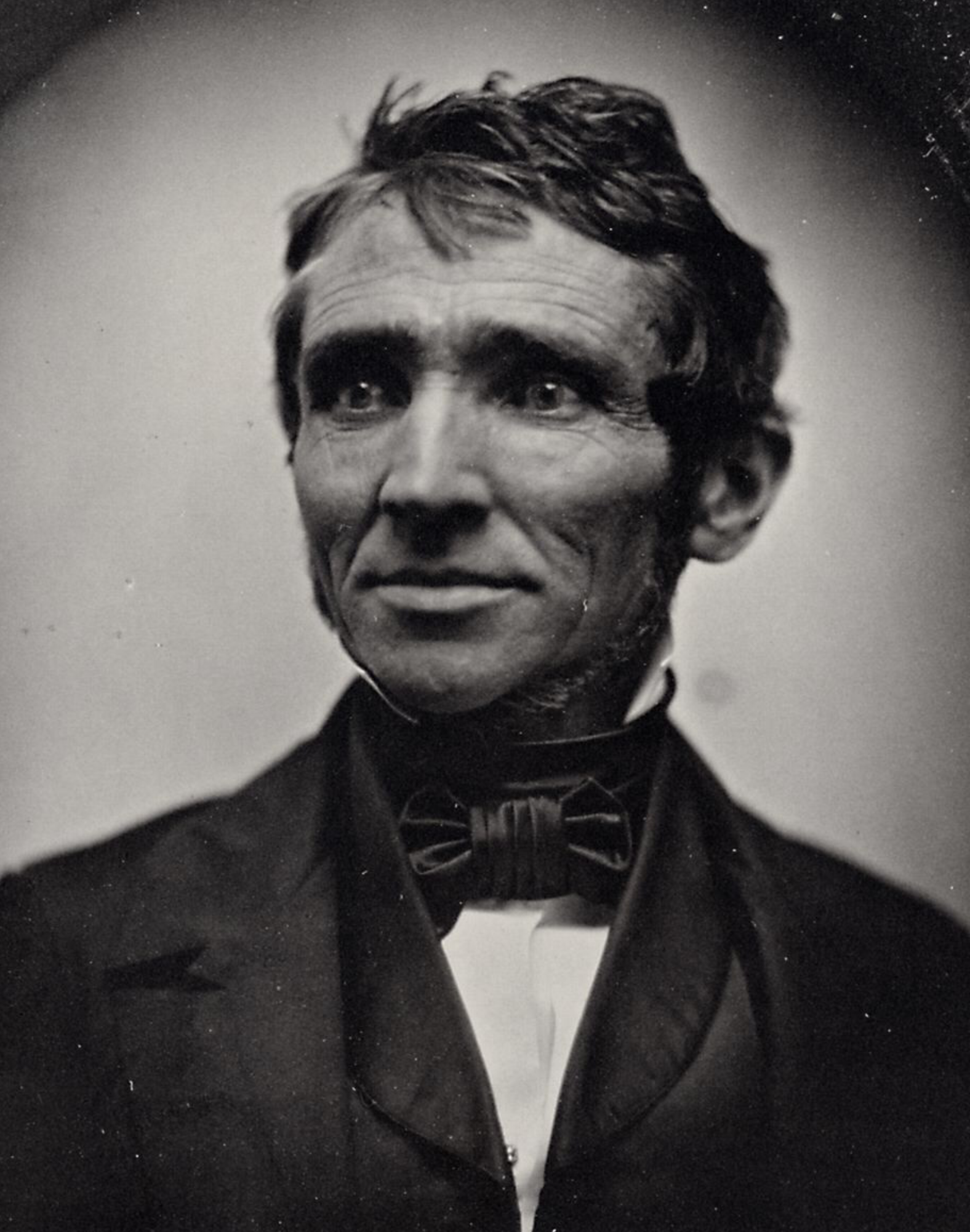
- Born: 29 December 1800; New Haven, Connecticut, U.S.
- Died: 1 July 1860 (aged 59); New York City, U.S.
- Spouse: Clarissa Beecher (m. August 1824)
- Children: Ellen M.P. Goodyear; Cynthia Goodyear; Charles Goodyear Jr.; Amelia P. Goodyear; Ann Goodyear; William Henry Goodyear
- Parents: Amasa Goodyear (b. 1 June 1772, d. 19 August 1841); Cynthia Bateman Goodyear
- Engineering career
- Projects: vulcanize rubber discovered in 1839, process perfected and patented in 1844.

Charles Goodyear (December 29, 1800 – July 1, 1860) was an American self-taught chemist and manufacturing engineer who developed vulcanized rubber, for which he received patent number 3633 from the United States Patent Office on June 15, 1844.

Goodyear is credited with inventing the chemical process to create and manufacture pliable, waterproof, moldable rubber.

Goodyear's discovery of the vulcanization process followed five years of searching for a more stable rubber and stumbling upon the effectiveness of heating after Thomas Hancock. His discovery initiated decades of successful rubber manufacturing in the Lower Naugatuck Valley in Connecticut, as rubber was adopted to multiple applications, including footwear and tires. The Goodyear Tire and Rubber Company is named after (though not founded by) him.

== Early life, family and education ==
Charles Goodyear was born on December 29, 1800, in New Haven, Connecticut, the son of Amasa Goodyear, and the oldest of six children. His father was a descendant of Stephen Goodyear, successor to Governor Eaton as the head of the company London Merchants, who founded the colony of New Haven in 1638.

Around 1817, Charles left his home and went to Philadelphia to learn the hardware business. He worked industriously until he was twenty-five years old, and then, returning to Connecticut, entered into a partnership in his father's business in Naugatuck, Connecticut, where they manufactured not only ivory and metal buttons, but also a variety of agricultural supplements. He had siblings Nelson Goodyear, Henry Goodyear, Robert Goodyear, Harriet Goodyear Tomlinson, Amasa Goodyear, Jr.

== Marriage and early career ==
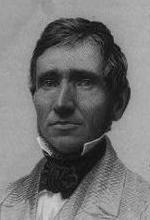
Engraving by W. G. Jackman, D. Appleton & Company, New York

On August 3, 1824, he married Clarissa Beecher, whom he met at his Congregational Church. Two years later the family moved to Philadelphia, and there Charles Goodyear opened a hardware store. This is where he did most of his work. His specialties were the valuable agricultural implements that his firm had been manufacturing, and after the first distrust of domestically made goods had worn away—for all agricultural implements were imported from England at that time—he found himself heading a successful business.

This continued to increase until it seemed that he was to be a wealthy man. Between 1829 and 1830 he broke down in health, being troubled with dyspepsia. At the same time, the failure of a number of business endeavors seriously embarrassed his firm. They struggled on, however, for some time, but were finally obliged to fail.

Between the years 1831 and 1832, Goodyear heard about gum elastic (natural rubber) and examined every article that appeared in the newspapers relative to this new material. The Roxbury Rubber Company, of Boston, had been for some time experimenting with the gum, and believed it had found means for manufacturing goods from it. It had a large plant and was sending its goods all over the country. It was some of Roxbury's goods that first attracted Goodyear's attention. Soon after this, Goodyear visited New York, and his attention went to life preservers, and it struck him that the tube used for inflation was not very effective nor well-made. Therefore, upon returning to Philadelphia, he made tubes and brought them back to New York and showed them to the manager of the Roxbury Rubber Company.

The manager was pleased with the ingenuity that Goodyear had shown in manufacturing the tubes. He confessed to Goodyear that the business was on the verge of ruin and that his products had to be tested for a year before it could be determined if they were perfect or not. To their surprise, goods that they had determined to be of good quality were being returned, the gum having rotted, making them useless. Goodyear at once made up his mind to experiment on this gum and see if he could overcome the problems with these rubber products.

However, when he returned to Philadelphia, a creditor had him arrested and imprisoned. While there, he tried his first experiments with India rubber. The gum was inexpensive then, and by heating it and working it in his hands, he managed to incorporate in it a certain amount of magnesia which produced a white compound that appeared to take away the stickiness.

He thought he had discovered the secret, and through the kindness of friends was able to improve his invention in New Haven. The first thing that he made was shoes, and he used his own house for grinding, calendering and vulcanizing, with the help of his wife and children. His compound at this time consisted of India rubber, lampblack, and magnesia, the whole dissolved in turpentine and spread upon the flannel cloth which served as the lining for the shoes. It was not long, however, before he discovered that the gum, even treated this way, became sticky. His creditors, completely discouraged, decided that he would not be allowed to go further in his research.

Goodyear, however, had no mind to stop here in his experiments. Selling his furniture and placing his family in a quiet boarding place, he went to New York and, helped by a friendly druggist, continued his experiments in an attic. His family's situation became so desperate that they were reduced to catching frogs and digging half-frozen potatoes to get by. His two sons died while they were still toddlers, aggravating the impact of poverty. His wife and children, however, stood by him.

Goodyear's next step was to compound the rubber with magnesia and then boil it in quicklime and water. This appeared to solve the problem. At once it was noticed abroad that he had treated India Rubber to lose its stickiness, and he received international acclamation. He seemed on the high road to success, until, one day, he noticed that a drop of weak acid, falling on the cloth, neutralized the alkali and immediately caused the rubber to become soft again. This proved to him that his process was not a successful one. He therefore continued experimenting, and after preparing his mixtures in his attic in New York, would walk three miles to a mill in Greenwich Village to try various experiments.

In the line of these, he discovered that rubber dipped in nitric acid formed a surface cure, and he made many products with this acid cure which were held in high regard, and he even received a letter of commendation from Andrew Jackson.

Exposure to harsh chemicals, such as nitric acid and lead oxide, adversely affected his health. Once, he nearly suffocated himself by gas generated in his laboratory. Goodyear survived, but the resulting fever came close to taking his life.

Together with an old business partner, he built up a factory and began to make clothing, life preservers, rubber shoes, and a great variety of rubber goods. They also had a large factory with special machinery, built at Staten Island, where he moved his family and again had a home of his own. Just about this time, when everything looked bright, the panic of 1837 came and swept away the entire fortune of his associate and left Goodyear penniless.

His next move was to go to Boston, where he became acquainted with J. Haskins of the Roxbury Rubber Company. Goodyear found him to be a supportive associate who lent him money and continued to assist him when others declined involvement with his work. A man named Mr. Chaffee was also helpful and willing to listen to his plans, as well as to provide financial assistance. Around this time, Mr. Chaffee suggested that many of the difficulties encountered in working India rubber might result from the solvent being used. He subsequently devised a large machine to perform the mixing by mechanical means. The goods produced in this way were visually appealing, and it again appeared that the existing difficulties had been resolved.

Goodyear discovered a new method for making rubber shoes and received a patent which he sold to the Providence Company in Rhode Island. However, a method had not yet been found to process rubber so that it would withstand hot and cold temperatures and acids, and so the rubber goods were constantly growing sticky, decomposing and being returned to the manufacturers.

== Perfection and patent of vulcanization ==
From 1834 through 1839, Goodyear worked anywhere he could find investors, and often moved locations, mostly within New York, Massachusetts, Philadelphia, and Connecticut. In 1839, Goodyear was at the Eagle India Rubber Company in Woburn, Massachusetts, where he discovered that combining rubber and sulfur over a hot stove caused the rubber to become rigid, a process which he called vulcanization because of the heat involved. For this Goodyear received US patent number 1090 on February 24 of the same year.

Several years earlier, Goodyear had started a small factory at Springfield, Massachusetts, to which he moved his primary operations in 1842. The factory was run largely by Nelson and his brothers. Charles Goodyear's brother-in-law, Mr. De Forest, a wealthy woolen manufacturer became involved as well. The work of making the invention practical was continued. In 1844, the process was sufficiently perfected and Goodyear received US patent number 3633, which mentions New York but not Springfield. Also in 1844, Goodyear's brother Henry introduced mechanical mixing of the mixture in place of the use of solvents. Goodyear sold some of these patents to Hiram Hutchinson who founded Hutchinson SA in France in 1853.

== Court cases regarding vulcanization ==
External videos
- Booknotes interview with Charles Slack on Noble Obsession: Charles Goodyear, Thomas Hancock, and the Race to Unlock the Greatest Industrial Secret of the Nineteenth Century, October 27, 2002, C-SPAN

As soon as Goodyear patented his process in 1844, he became the subject of lawsuits from envious rubber entrepreneurs, who had failed in their own attempts but falsely claimed that Goodyear had stolen ideas from them or others. Goodyear's star and fortunes slowly rose as he prevailed in these trials, and by 1851 he was able to hire the famed orator and jurist Daniel Webster as his company's lawyer.

In 1852, Goodyear went to Europe, a trip that he had long planned, and saw Thomas Hancock, then in the employ of Charles Macintosh & Company. Hancock claimed to have invented vulcanization independently and had received a British patent, initiated in 1843 but finalized in 1844. In 1855, in the last of three patent disputes with his fellow British rubber pioneer Stephen Moulton, Hancock's patent was challenged with the claim that Hancock had copied Goodyear. Goodyear attended the trial. If Hancock lost, Goodyear stood to have his own British patent application granted, allowing him to claim royalties from both Hancock and Moulton. Both had examined Goodyear's vulcanized rubber in 1842, but several chemists testified that it would not have been possible to determine how it was made by studying it. Hancock prevailed.

Despite his misfortune with patents, Goodyear wrote, “In reflecting upon the past, as relates to these branches of industry, the writer is not disposed to repine, and say that he has planted, and others have gathered the fruits. The advantages of a career in life should not be estimated exclusively by the standard of dollars and cents, as is too often done. Man has just cause for regret when he sows and no one reaps.”

In 1855, Goodyear was sent to debtor's prison in both England and France, both relating to debts he had incurred demonstrating uses of vulcanization at the Exposition Universelle. These would be his last of many incarcerations in debtor's prison. He was inducted into the Legion of Honour while imprisoned.

In 1858, Goodyear won a seven-year extension on his American patent on the grounds of financial hardship. Although he had earned nearly $163,000 from the patent, he owed far more to creditors who had supported him in his journey to develop the vulcanization process and bring vulcanized products to market. He had now become famous as the inventor of vulcanization through continuous newspaper coverage of his court battles, and this final court victory reportedly won him mental peace after decades' struggle. He continued to think of new applications for rubber until his death.

== Death and legacy ==
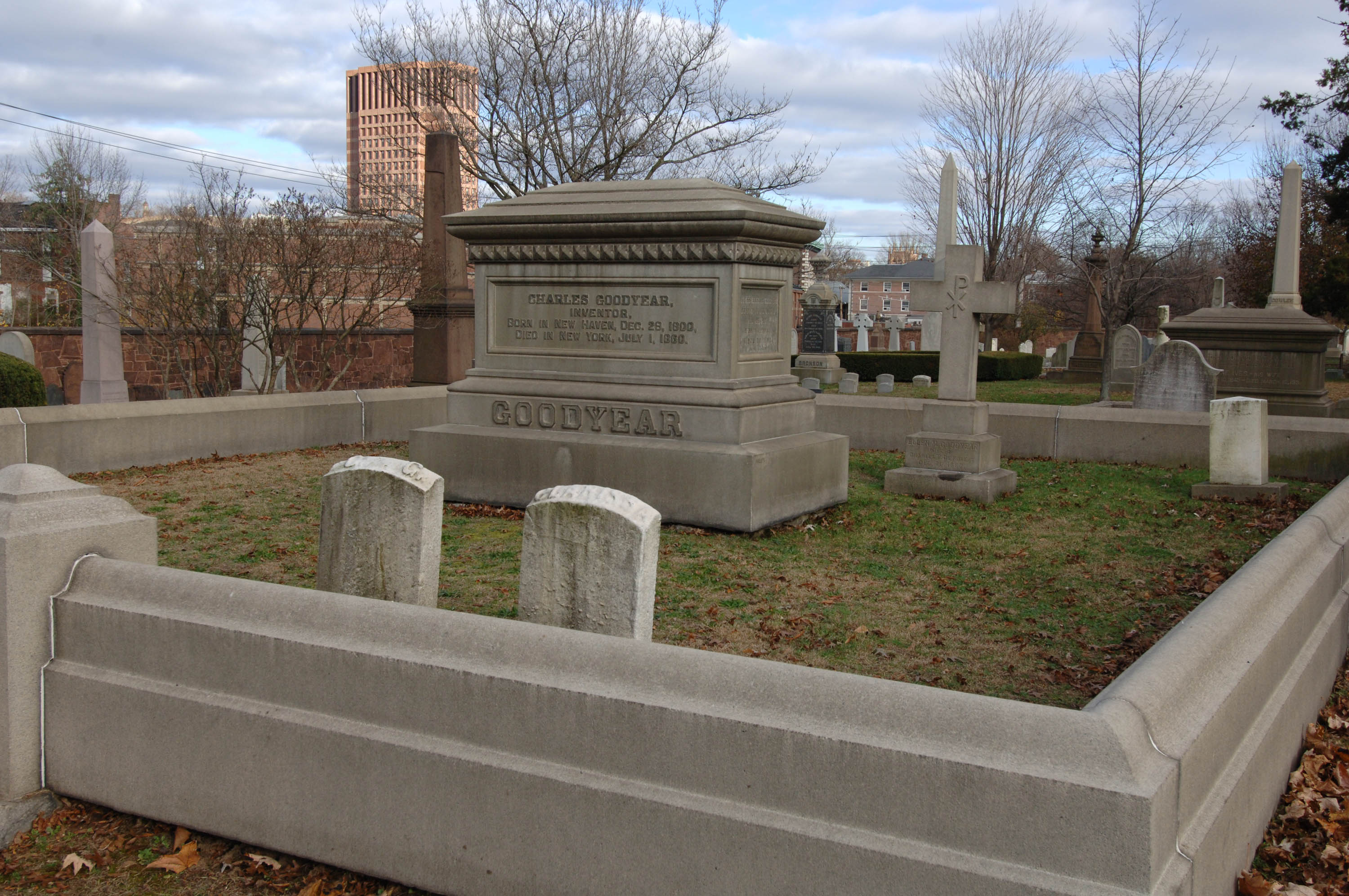
Goodyear's grave in New Haven, Connecticut

Goodyear died on July 1, 1860, while traveling to see his dying daughter. After arriving in New York, he was informed that she had already died. He collapsed and was taken to the Fifth Avenue Hotel in New York City, where he died at the age of 59. Goodyear had never made a proper accounting of his debt, and at the time of his death his estate was in almost $200,000 of debt. His son Charles Jr. untangled the mismanaged books, paid off creditors, and provided a modest income for his family.

In 1898, almost four decades after his death, The Goodyear Tire & Rubber Company was founded and named after Goodyear by Frank Seiberling.

On February 8, 1976, he was among six individuals selected for induction into the National Inventors Hall of Fame.

In Woburn, Massachusetts, there is an elementary school named after him. The Government of France made him a Chevalier de la Légion d'honneur in 1855.

The ACS Rubber Division awards a medal named in Goodyear's honor, the Charles Goodyear Medal. The medal honors principal inventors, innovators, and developers whose contributions resulted in a significant change to the nature of the rubber industry.

The Goodyear welt, a technique in shoemaking, was named after and in honor of its inventor, Charles' son; Charles Goodyear Jr.

== See also ==
- Leverett Candee, first person to manufacture rubber footwear under the Goodyear vulcanization process.
- William Henry Goodyear, his son
- Goodyear Tire and Rubber Company
- Vulcanization
