= IntoUniversity =

British Charity/Organisation

- Formation: 2002; 24 years ago
- Founders: Hugh Rayment-Pickard, Clare Richards, Rachel Carr
- Founded at: North Kensington, London
- Legal status: Registered charity
- Purpose: Provides higher education for disadvantaged young people
- Chair of Trustees: Oliver Haarmann
- Website: intouniversity.org

IntoUniversity is a United Kingdom-based charity that aims to help young people from disadvantaged backgrounds achieve their chosen aspiration, including university, further and higher education, employment and work-based training. It provides encouragement to children and young people aged 7–18 in pursuing further education.

== History ==
It was formed from The ClementJames Centre, near Avondale Park in west London.

== Locations ==
IntoUniversity started off with a pilot centre at North Kensington in 2002, and now operates 39 centres and extension projects across England and Scotland.

IntoUniversity was selected by William and Catherine (then Catherine Middleton), prince and princess of Wales, as one of the charities to receive a gift fund from the royal wedding in April 2011.

== Awards ==
- Charity of the Year, Charity Times
- Centre for Social Justice Award
- London Education Partnership Awards, for "Building bridges: cross-organisational partnership and impact"
