= Lucas (contractor) =

English contracting company

- Industry: Spray painting, coatings and fit out services
- Founded: 1969
- Headquarters: Wrotham, England
- Key people: Danny Lucas, executive chairman and managing director
- Website: www.lucasuk.com

Lucas is an English company that offers specialised contracting services in the fields of coating, fit-out and finishing to the construction industry. The company is headquartered in Wrotham, Kent.

== History ==
Lucas was founded in 1969 (S. Lucas Ltd was incorporated in July 1976) and its sister operation, Lucas Fit Out, was established in 2008. Danny Lucas joined the company in 1982 and became managing director in 1997. In late 2010, Danny Lucas acquired the main shareholding and became executive chairman and managing director of Lucas. Lucas completed building a new innovation centre at its headquarters, and opened a new visitor and learning centre there in March 2018. Lucas is a technology partner of McLaren, the F1 and engineering group. During the COVID-19 pandemic in the United Kingdom, Lucas designed and manufactured hand wash sanitizer stations which it both gave away to health centres and sold to raise money for the British Lung Foundation.

== Services ==
Lucas provides decorative and protective coatings services including general decoration, spray applied finishes, protective and hygienic coatings and special paint effects. It also provides commercial fit-out and finishing services. In July 2010 the company re-launched the Muralplast brand of coatings and protective finishes. In February 2017 it launched Lucas Breathe, a protective treatment for stone and concrete surfaces that reacts with sunlight, activating a catalytic reaction with pollutants in the air, turning them into harmless trace elements which disperse naturally. Lucas became a Living Well Alliance partner with the British Lung Foundation. It opened its own 3D printing laboratory in June 2019.

=== Lucas ProTools ===
Lucas Pro Tools is a subsidiary company providing a range of products for painting and decorating professionals. The company and its flagship product, the ProFinish paintbrush, was launched at an event held at the McLaren Technology Centre in November 2014.

In 2015, the ProFinish brush won the product design prize at the Red Dot Awards. It was also shortlisted for product of the year at the Mixology awards, organized by Mix Interiors magazine. Lucas launched its online Lucas ProStore in March 2019.

== Projects ==
Lucas's finishing and fit-out projects have included Heathrow Terminal 5, the O2, London Stadium, The Shard, Centre Point, Television Centre, the Bloomberg headquarters building, Southbank Place and Battersea Power Station. Heritage projects have included the Guildhall in London, the Royal Shakespeare Theatre at Stratford-upon-Avon and the Café Royal in London's Regent Street. Other projects include Westfield Stratford City shopping centre in East London, Birmingham New Street station, and the Tate Modern extension.

Lucas's commercial buildings fit-out and finishing service have been deployed on financial datacentres, facilities at Heathrow and the refurbishment of the Savoy Hotel in London. It delivered the fit-out of the two stations at the Emirates Air Line cable car crossing over the River Thames in East London.
