= Malcolm Green (physician) =

British physician

Sir Malcolm Green is a retired British physician who was Vice-Principal of the Imperial College School of Medicine and Head of the National Heart and Lung Institute.

== Education and career ==
Green studied medicine at Trinity College, Oxford, and St Thomas' Medical School before being appointed consultant physician at St Bartholomew's Hospital and the Royal Brompton Hospital, a position he held from 1975 to 2006.

His main interest was in respiratory physiology and respiratory muscle function, both healthy and diseased. In 1985 he founded the British Lung Foundation, serving as its chair for 10 years and later as its president. He was dean of the National Heart and Lung Institute from 1988 to 1990, director of the British Postgraduate Medical Federation from 1991 to 1996 and, for a time, head of research and development for the National Health Service. In 1997 he was appointed Vice-Principal for postgraduate medicine and campus dean at Imperial College School of Medicine.

== Personal life ==
Green was married to the photographer Julieta Preston (1943−2018). Their daughter, the artist Nicola Green (b. 1972) married the British politician David Lammy in 2005.

== Honours ==
Green was awarded the British Thoracic Society medal in 2005, and he was knighted for his services to medicine in the 2007 New Year Honours.
