= Out of the Ashes (Lammy book) =

2011 book by David Lammy

- First edition
- Author: David Lammy
- Publisher: Random House
- Publication date: 2011

Out of the Ashes: Britain after the riots is a 2011 book by the British Labour Party politician David Lammy about the 2011 England riots.
