= Nicola Green =

British portrait painter (born 1972)

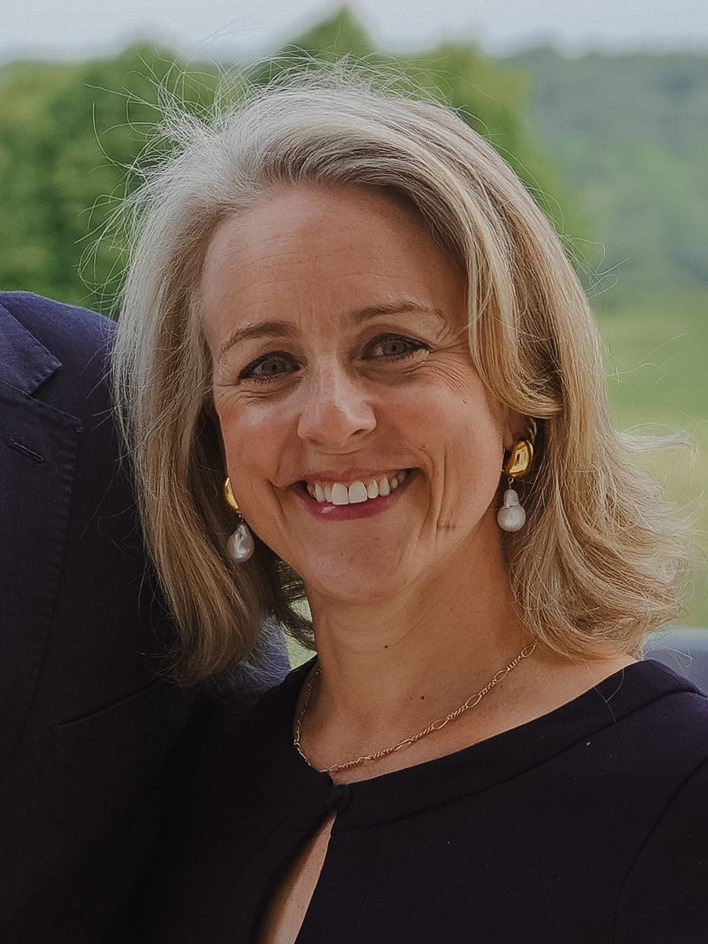
- Green in 2025
- Born: 1972 (age 53–54)
- Spouse: David Lammy (m. 2005)
- Children: 3
- Website: nicolagreen.com

Nicola Green (born 1972) is a British portrait painter, social historian and public speaker. Her subjects have included the Dalai Lama, Barack Obama and Diana, Princess of Wales. She is married to David Lammy, who served as Deputy Prime Minister of the United Kingdom from 2025 until 2026.

== Family and personal life ==
The daughter of Sir Malcolm Green and Julieta Preston (1943−2018), Green has Ashkenazi Jewish, Russian Orthodox and Anglican roots. She explored atheism and various other religions before ultimately returning to her Anglican faith.

In 2005 she married the Labour politician David Lammy, who served as Deputy Prime Minister, Secretary of State for Justice and Lord Chancellor in the United Kingdom from September 2025 to July 2026. They have three children.

== Artwork and exhibitions ==
=== In Seven Days ===
In 2010, Green created In Seven Days... a set of seven silk-screen prints depicting Barack Obama's 2008 presidential election campaign. Green was inspired by her mixed-heritage children to record these events for the future. She gained access to Obama's campaign, making six trips to events, such as his nomination at the 2008 Democratic National Convention in Denver and Inauguration in Washington D.C. In 2011, a set of In Seven Days... was donated to the Library of Congress; another set was placed in the Metropolitan Museum of Art. This series has also been exhibited at Harvard Law School, Walker Art Gallery and Said Business School.

In October 2026, HENI Publishing released Nicola Green: In Seven Days..., the first in-depth examination of her 2010 series In Seven Days.... The book includes previously unpublished sketches, drawings, and photographs from Green's time on Obama's 2008 campaign. It features contributions from Katherine Blood, Ben Rhodes, Dr. Sarah Lewis, Dr. Louise Bernard, Ekow Eshun, Hans Ulrich Obrist, Dr. Flavia Figeri, Dr. Aaron Rosen, Suki Kim and Jana Degrott.

=== Encounters ===
Encounters, a series of fifty portraits of religious leaders all with their faces and hands painted out, was shown at the church of St. Martin-in-the-Fields in Trafalgar Square in 2018. Among those represented were Pope Francis, the Dalai Lama, Ali Gomaa, Jonathan Sacks and Justin Welby. Encounters was a collaboration with Coexist House, the University of Cambridge and King's College London. An accompanying book edited by Aaron Rosen, Encounters: The Art of Interfaith Dialogue, was published by Brepols.

=== Awards ===
Accolades for Green include twice being an exhibitor for the BP Portrait Award at the National Portrait Gallery in London, in 2006 and 2008.

== Other work ==
Green is a co-founder and trustee for Sophia Point, an education and conservation charity working in Guyana.
