= Muralplast =

British surface coating products

- Type: Protective coatings
- Inception: c. 1960s
- Manufacturer: Lucas
- Available: Available
- Current supplier: S. Lucas
- Models: M-Guard, Multi Surface Paint, ArmourColor, and M-Tred
- Website: www.muralplast.co.uk

Muralplast is a range of coatings and protective treatments applied by British specialist painting contractor Lucas and intended to be sustainable.

== History ==
Muralplast was first launched in the 1960s and became known as a coatings product for exterior and interior protection and decoration. Lucas extended the range of products and re-launched the brand in July 2010.

== Products ==
There are four main product ranges.

- M-Guard is designed to provide extra protection from the weather, pollution, and vandalism.
- MSP or Multi Surface Paint is designed to provide a consistent finish across internal and external surfaces.
- ArmourColor is designed to provide decorative wall finishes incorporating high safety and environmental standards.
- M-Tred floor resins are designed to be durable floor finishes, formulated for buildings required to meet high health and safety standards or other special regulations.
