= David Lammy =

Deputy Prime Minister of the United Kingdom from 2025 to 2026

The Right Honourable David Lammy MP FRSA
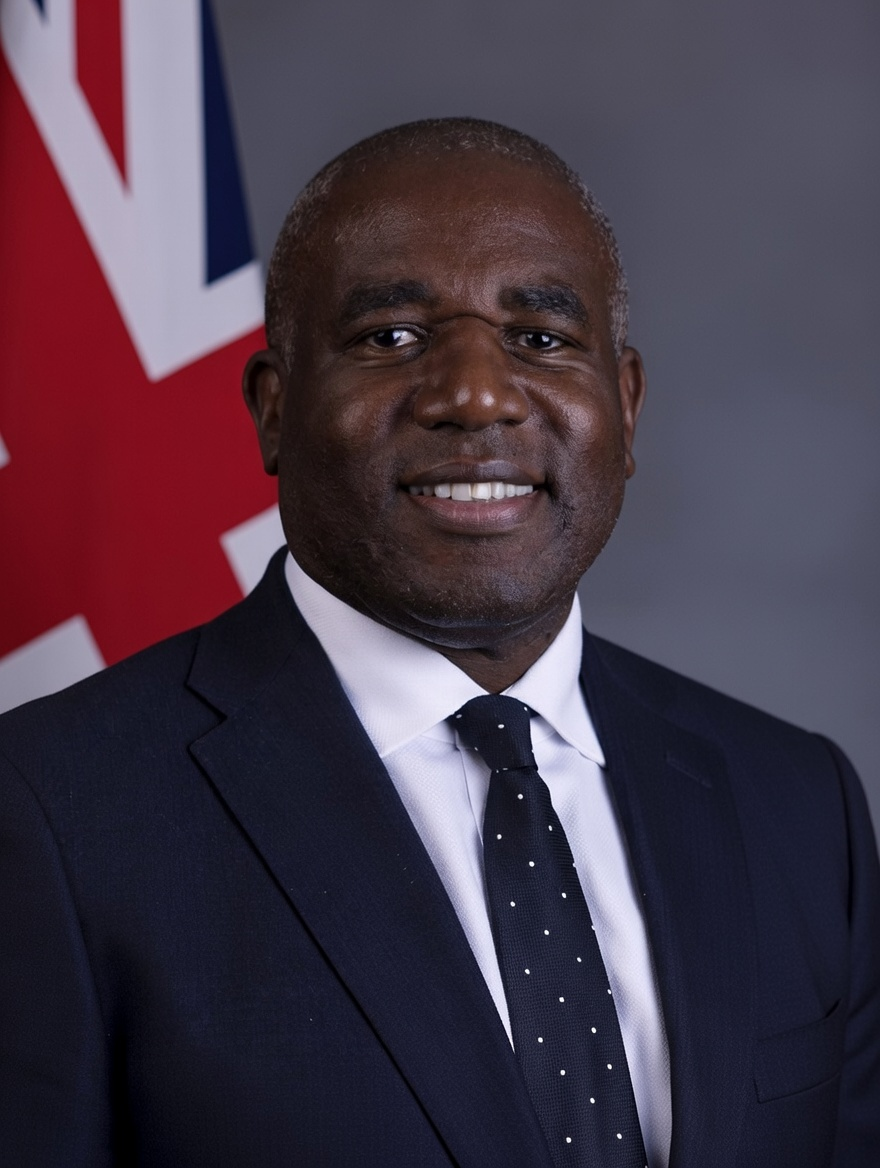
- Official portrait, 2025

Deputy Prime Minister of the United Kingdom
- In office 5 September 2025 – 20 July 2026
- Monarch: Charles III
- Prime Minister: Keir Starmer
- Preceded by: Angela Rayner
- Succeeded by: Vacant (Note: Louise Haigh was appointed as First Secretary of State)

Secretary of State for Justice Lord Chancellor
- In office 5 September 2025 – 20 July 2026
- Prime Minister: Keir Starmer
- Preceded by: Shabana Mahmood
- Succeeded by: Alex Norris

Foreign Secretary
- In office 5 July 2024 – 5 September 2025
- Prime Minister: Keir Starmer
- Preceded by: David Cameron
- Succeeded by: Yvette Cooper
Junior ministerial offices
Minister of State for Higher Education and Intellectual Property
In office 5 October 2008 – 11 May 2010
Prime Minister	Gordon Brown
Preceded by	Bill Rammell
Succeeded by	David Willetts
Parliamentary Under-Secretary of State for Innovation, Universities and Skills
In office 29 June 2007 – 5 October 2008
Prime Minister	Gordon Brown
Preceded by	Office established
Succeeded by	Siôn Simon
Minister of State for Culture
In office 10 May 2005 – 28 June 2007
Prime Minister	Tony Blair
Preceded by	Estelle Morris
Succeeded by	Margaret Hodge
Parliamentary Under-Secretary of State for Constitutional Affairs
In office 13 June 2003 – 10 May 2005
Prime Minister	Tony Blair
Preceded by	Office established
Succeeded by	Bridget Prentice
Parliamentary Under-Secretary of State for Public Health
In office 29 May 2002 – 13 June 2003
Prime Minister	Tony Blair
Preceded by	Yvette Cooper
Succeeded by	Melanie Johnson
Shadow portfolios
Shadow Secretary of State
2021–2024	Shadow Foreign Secretary
2020–2021	Justice
Shadow Minister
2010–2010	Universities and Science

Member of Parliament for Tottenham
- Incumbent
- Assumed office 22 June 2000
- Preceded by: Bernie Grant
- Majority: 15,434 (38.4%)

Member of the London Assembly as an additional member
- In office 4 May 2000 – 4 July 2000
- Preceded by: Office established
- Succeeded by: Jennette Arnold

Personal details
- Born: David Lindon Lammy; 19 July 1972 (age 54) Archway, London, England
- Citizenship: United Kingdom; Guyana
- Party: Labour
- Spouse: Nicola Green (m. 2005)
- Children: 3
- Education: SOAS University of London (LLB); Harvard University (LLM)
- Occupation: Politician; lawyer; lecturer; presenter
- Website: www.davidlammy.co.uk
- Lammy's voice Lammy describing White Hart Lane in 2012

David Lindon Lammy (born 19 July 1972) is a British politician who served as Deputy Prime Minister of the United Kingdom, Secretary of State for Justice, and Lord Chancellor from September 2025 to July 2026. He previously served as Foreign Secretary from July 2024 to September 2025. A member of the Labour Party, he has been member of Parliament (MP) for Tottenham since 2000. Lammy previously held various junior ministerial positions under Tony Blair and Gordon Brown between 2002 and 2010.

Born in London, Lammy attended The King's School, Peterborough. He studied law at the School of Oriental and African Studies (SOAS), University of London and was called to the bar in 1994. He later studied for a Master of Laws degree at Harvard University, becoming the first black Briton to study at Harvard Law School. In 2000, Lammy briefly served in the London Assembly before being elected to Parliament in the 2000 Tottenham by-election. Tony Blair appointed him Parliamentary Under-Secretary of State for Public Health in 2002 and Parliamentary Under-Secretary of State for Constitutional Affairs in 2003. He was promoted to Minister of State for Culture in 2005. In 2007, Gordon Brown appointed him Parliamentary Under-Secretary of State for Innovation, Universities and Skills before Lammy served as Minister of State for Higher Education from 2008 to 2010.

Following Labour's defeat in the 2010 general election, Lammy endorsed David Miliband in the 2010 Labour leadership election and subsequently declined to serve in Ed Miliband's Shadow Cabinet. He then spent the next decade on the backbenches, and was a candidate in the 2015 London Labour Party mayoral selection but ultimately finished fourth. Lammy endorsed Keir Starmer in the 2020 Labour leadership election and was appointed Shadow Secretary of State for Justice and Shadow Lord Chancellor in Starmer's Shadow Cabinet. In the November 2021 Shadow Cabinet reshuffle, he was promoted to Shadow Foreign Secretary.

Following Labour's victory in the 2024 general election, Lammy returned to government after being appointed Foreign Secretary by Starmer in his ministry. As Foreign Secretary, Lammy helped negotiate the transfer of the Chagos Islands to Mauritius and several trade deals following the introduction of Donald Trump's tariffs. In the 2025 cabinet reshuffle, he was appointed Justice Secretary, Lord Chancellor and Deputy Prime Minister. He is the first person of colour to hold the latter position. He was dismissed from the government by Andy Burnham in July 2026 and returned to the backbenches.

== Early life and career ==
David Lindon Lammy was born on 19 July 1972 in Whittington Hospital in Archway, north London, to Guyanese parents David and Rosalind Lammy. He and his four siblings were raised solely by his mother after his father left the family when Lammy was 12 years old. Lammy has spoken about the importance of fathers and the need to support them in seeking to be active in the lives of their children. He has chaired the All-Party Parliamentary Group on Fatherhood, and has written on the issue.

Lammy grew up in Tottenham, and went to Downhills Primary School. At the age of 10, he was awarded an Inner London Education Authority choral scholarship to sing at Peterborough Cathedral and received a state school education at The King's School, Peterborough.

Lammy studied at the School of Oriental and African Studies (SOAS), University of London, graduating with a 2:1 in law. He was called to the bar of England and Wales in 1994 at Lincoln's Inn. He went on to study at Harvard University, where he became the first black Briton to attend Harvard Law School; he studied for a Master of Laws degree and graduated in 1997.

After Harvard Lammy was employed as an attorney at Howard Rice (now part of Arnold & Porter) in California from 1997 to 1998, and with D. J. Freeman (now part of Troutman Pepper Locke) from 1998 to 2000. He is a visiting professor of practice at SOAS.

== Parliamentary career ==
In May 2000 Lammy was elected for Labour on the London-wide list to the London Assembly. Later in the same month, he was selected as the Labour candidate for the parliamentary constituency of Tottenham, following the recent death of the veteran member of parliament (MP), Bernie Grant. Lammy was elected to the seat in a by-election held on 22 June 2000 with 53.5% of the vote and a majority of 5,646. Aged 27, he was the youngest MP in the house at the time.

Lammy was re-elected as MP for Tottenham at the 2001 general election with an increased vote share of 67.5% and an increased majority of 16,916.

=== Minister ===
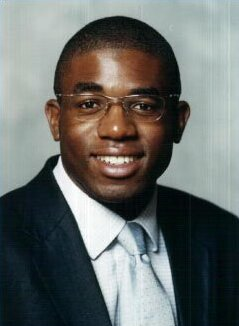
Official portrait, 2002

In 2002, he was appointed by Prime Minister Tony Blair as Parliamentary under-secretary of state in the Department of Health. In 2003, Lammy was appointed by Blair as a Parliamentary Under-Secretary of State in the Department for Constitutional Affairs and while a member of the Government, voted in favour of authorisation for Britain to invade Iraq in 2003.

At the 2005 general election Lammy was again re-elected, with a decreased vote share of 57.9% and a decreased majority of 13,034. After the election, Blair appointed Lammy as Minister for Culture at the Department of Culture, Media and Sport.

In June 2007 new prime minister Gordon Brown demoted Lammy to the rank of Parliamentary Under-Secretary of State in the Department for Innovation, Universities and Skills. In October 2008, he was promoted by Brown to Minister of State and appointed to the Privy Council. In June 2009, Brown appointed Lammy as Minister for Higher Education in the new Department for Business, Innovation and Skills, leading the Commons ministerial team as Peter Mandelson, who sat in the House of Lords, was then Secretary of State.

=== Opposition backbencher ===
At the 2010 general election, Lammy was again re-elected, with an increased vote share of 59.3% and an increased majority of 16,931. After Labour lost the election, Lammy returned to the backbenches, and a Labour Party leadership contest was announced. During the contest Lammy nominated Diane Abbott, saying that he felt it was important to have a diverse field of candidates, but subsequently declared his support for David Miliband. Following the election of Ed Miliband, Lammy pledged his full support but turned down a post in the Shadow cabinet, highlighting the need to speak on a wide range of issues that would arise in his constituency due to "large cuts in the public services".

In 2012 Lammy pledged his support to Ken Livingstone's bid to become the Labour London mayoral candidate in the 2012 London mayoral election, declaring him "London's Mayor in waiting". Lammy became Livingstone's selection campaign chair. In 2014, Lammy announced that he was considering entering the race to become Mayor of London in the 2016 election.

Lammy was again re-elected at the 2015 general election with an increased vote share of 67.3% and an increased majority of 23,564. Following the party's defeat, Lammy was one of 36 Labour MPs to nominate Jeremy Corbyn, whom he is good friends with, as a candidate in the Labour leadership election of 2015.

=== London mayoral candidate ===
On 4 September 2014 Lammy announced his intention to seek the Labour nomination for the 2016 mayoral election. In the London Labour Party's selection process, he secured 9.4% of first preference votes and was fourth overall, behind Sadiq Khan, Tessa Jowell and Diane Abbott.

In March 2016 he was fined £5,000 for instigating 35,629 automatic phone calls urging people to back his mayoral campaign without gaining permission to contact the party members concerned. Lammy apologised "unreservedly" for breach of the Privacy and Electronic Communications (EC Directive) Regulations 2003. It was the first time a politician had been fined for authorising nuisance calls.

=== Return to the frontbench ===
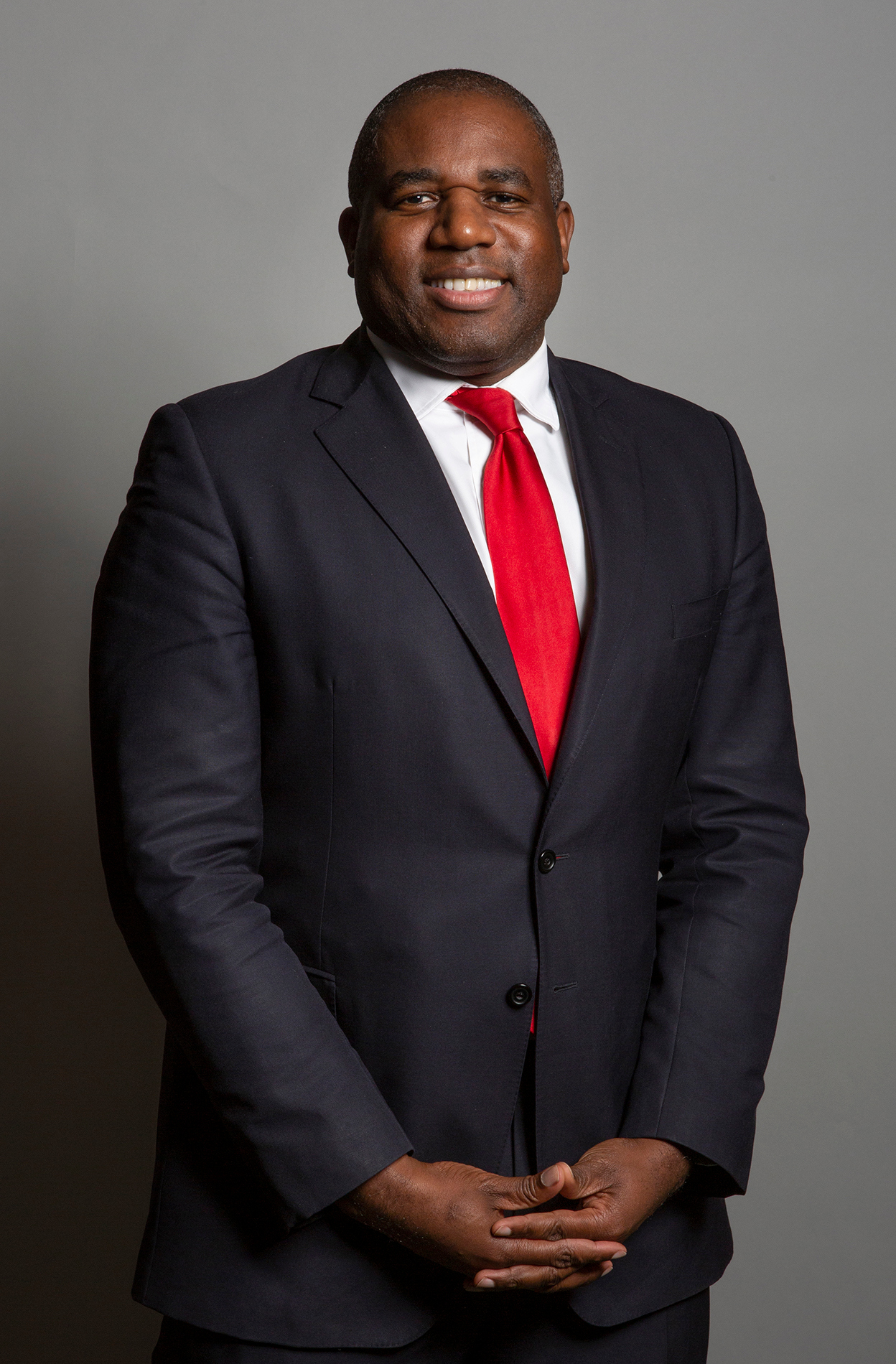
Official portrait, 2019

At the snap 2017 general election, Lammy was again re-elected with an increased vote share of 81.6% and an increased majority of 34,584. At the 2019 general election, Lammy was again re-elected, with a decreased vote share of 76% and a decreased majority of 30,175.

Lammy endorsed Keir Starmer and Angela Rayner in the 2020 Labour leadership and deputy leadership elections. After Starmer was elected Labour leader in April 2020, Lammy was appointed to the Shadow Cabinet as Shadow Secretary of State for Justice. In the November 2021 Shadow Cabinet reshuffle, Lammy was promoted to Shadow Foreign Secretary.

On 7 February 2022, while Lammy and Starmer were leaving Parliament, they were ambushed by a group of people who shouted abuse at Starmer including the words "traitor" and "Jimmy Savile". This followed Boris Johnson falsely blaming Starmer for the non-prosecution of Savile when Starmer was Director of Public Prosecutions in the Crown Prosecution Service. Starmer was DPP in the years immediately prior to Savile's death but there is no evidence he was involved in the decision to not have him prosecuted. Two people, a man and a woman, were arrested after a traffic cone was thrown at police officers. Johnson tweeted that it was "absolutely disgraceful" and thanked the police for acting swiftly. Shayan Sardarizadeh for BBC Monitoring said that the protest was an attempt to recreate the Ottawa "freedom convoy" protests in the UK, and noted that the activists' references to Magna Carta indicated that the protesters were members of the sovereign citizen movement. Julian Smith, the former chief whip, and Simon Hoare were among Conservatives who called for Johnson to apologise. MP Kim Leadbeater and Brendan Cox, the respective sister and husband of murdered MP Jo Cox, warned against politicians lending credence to far-right conspiracy theories. The following day, a Downing Street source said that Johnson still would not apologise for the slur against Starmer. Following the incident when activists forced police to protect Lammy and Starmer extremists issued multiple death threats against Starmer and other Labour MPs. The Center for Countering Digital Hate (CCDH) sent material to the Metropolitan Police. Imran Ahmed of the CCDH stated, "Every time a violent extremist makes a threat of violence and gets away with it, the norms of those groups worsen, and others are driven to newer depths of behaviour."

In August 2022 an inquiry found that he had inadvertently breached the MPs' code of conduct. He apologised in a letter to Parliamentary Standards Commissioner Kathryn Stone.

In January 2023 Lammy visited Northern Ireland with Shadow Secretary Peter Kyle and Shadow Cabinet Office Minister Jenny Chapman, visiting Foyle Port to make a statement on the Northern Ireland Protocol.

On 19 November 2023 Lammy visited Israel and had a meeting with Israeli president Isaac Herzog and Foreign Minister Eli Cohen. That month, Lammy said an Israeli strike on a refugee camp could be "legally justified". In January 2024, as he was giving a speech, he was interrupted by pro-Palestinian protesters.

At the 2024 general election, Lammy was again re-elected with a decreased vote share of 57.5% and a decreased majority of 15,434.

=== Foreign Secretary ===
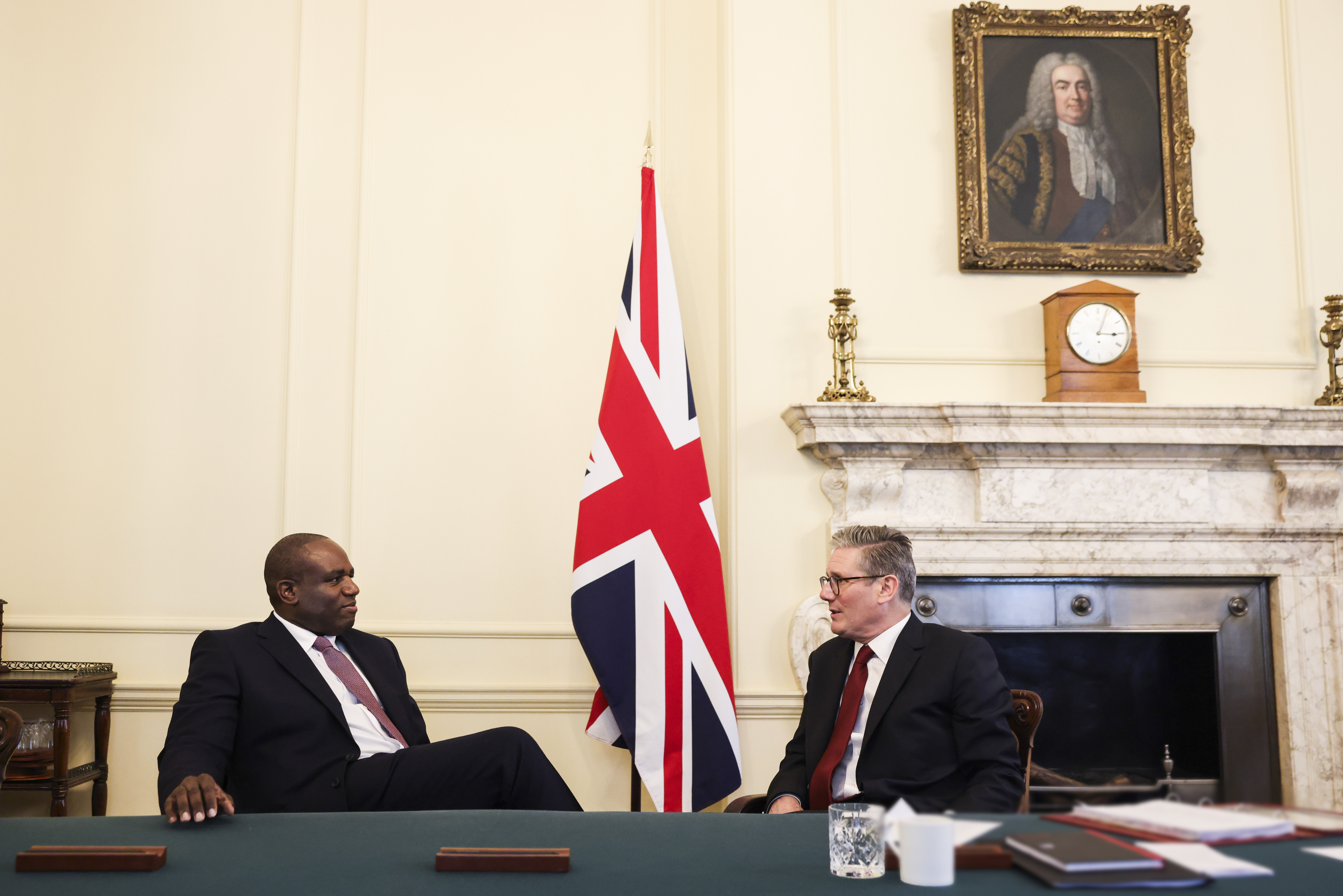
Lammy appointed as foreign secretary by Keir Starmer, 5 July 2024

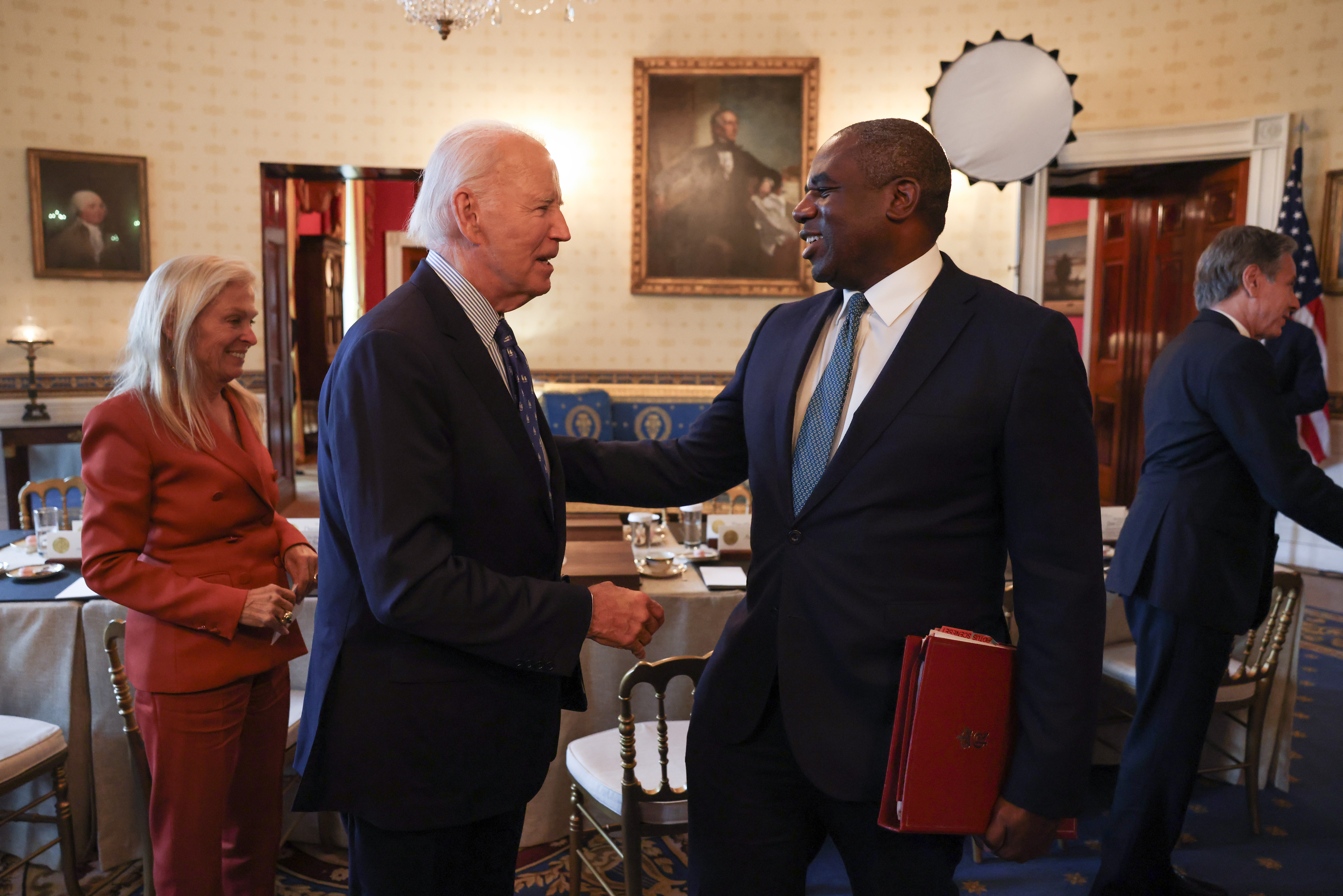
Lammy with US president Joe Biden in September 2024

Lammy was appointed foreign secretary by Starmer in his ministry on 5 July 2024. He took his first international trip as foreign secretary meeting his counterparts in Poland (Radosław Sikorski), Germany (Annalena Baerbock) and Sweden (Tobias Billström). These meetings involved matters including the Russian invasion of Ukraine and the Gaza war. Lammy stated that the UK government wanted to "reset" its relations with the European Union, with their plans including a new joint security pact covering defence, energy policies, the climate crisis, pandemic prevention and illegal immigration.

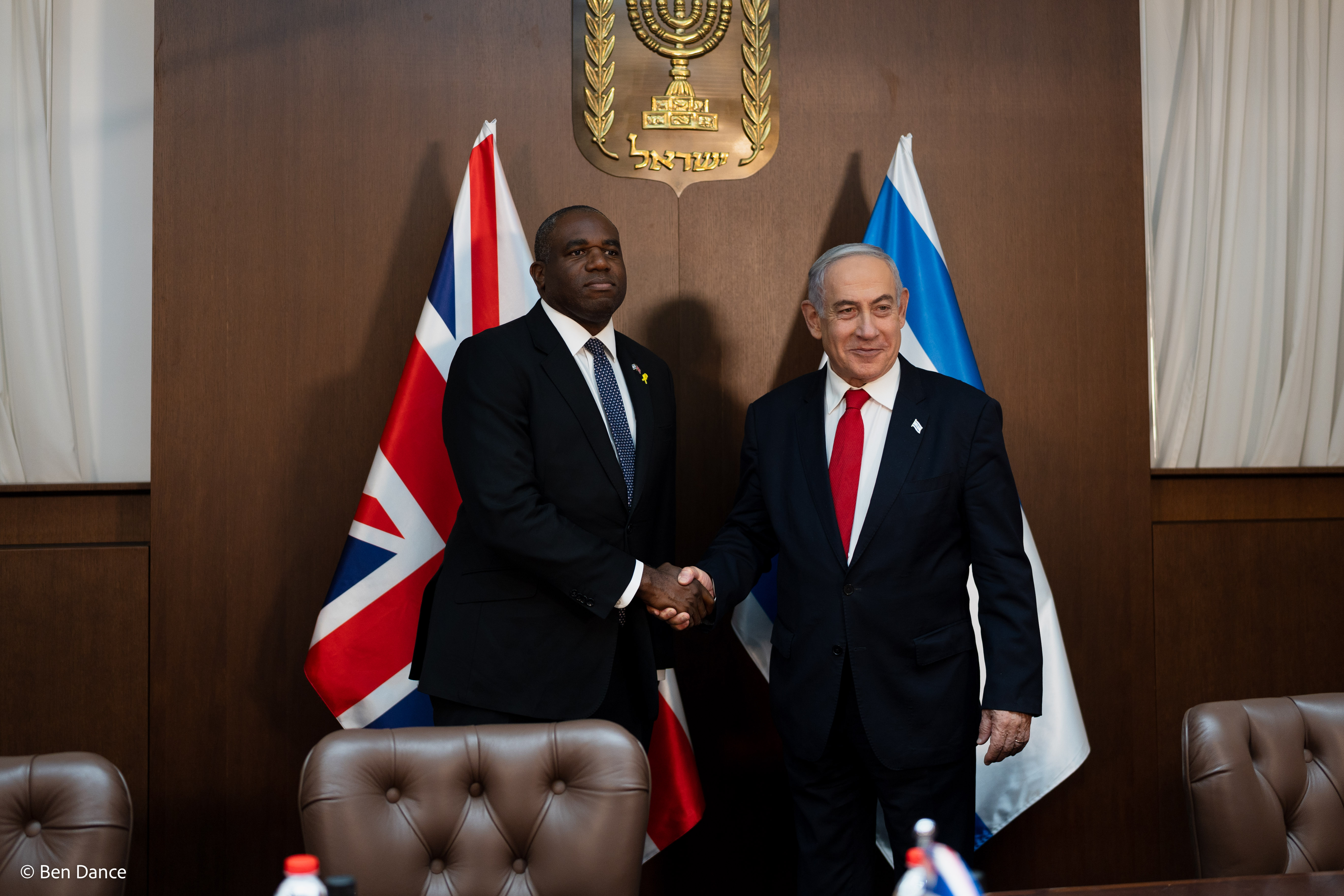
Lammy with Israeli Prime Minister Benjamin Netanyahu in Jerusalem, 14 July 2024

On 13 July 2024 Lammy condemned the attempted assassination of Donald Trump in Pennsylvania. Lammy had previously been critical of Donald Trump, calling him "a tyrant" and "a woman-hating, neo-Nazi-sympathising sociopath" in 2018. Following Trump's victory in the 2024 United States presidential election, Lammy dismissed past criticism of Trump as "old news".

On 14 July 2024 Lammy visited Israel and met with the families of Israeli hostages held in the Gaza Strip. He called for a ceasefire in Gaza that would be conditional on the release of all hostages. After receiving assurances of its neutrality, Lammy announced the resumption of British funding to the UNRWA, stating that the humanitarian situation in Gaza was "desperate" and "no other agency" could deliver aid on the scale needed.

Lammy promised to review the UK's relationship with China. In August 2024, Lammy declined to state whether the persecution of the Uyghur minority in China constituted a genocide.

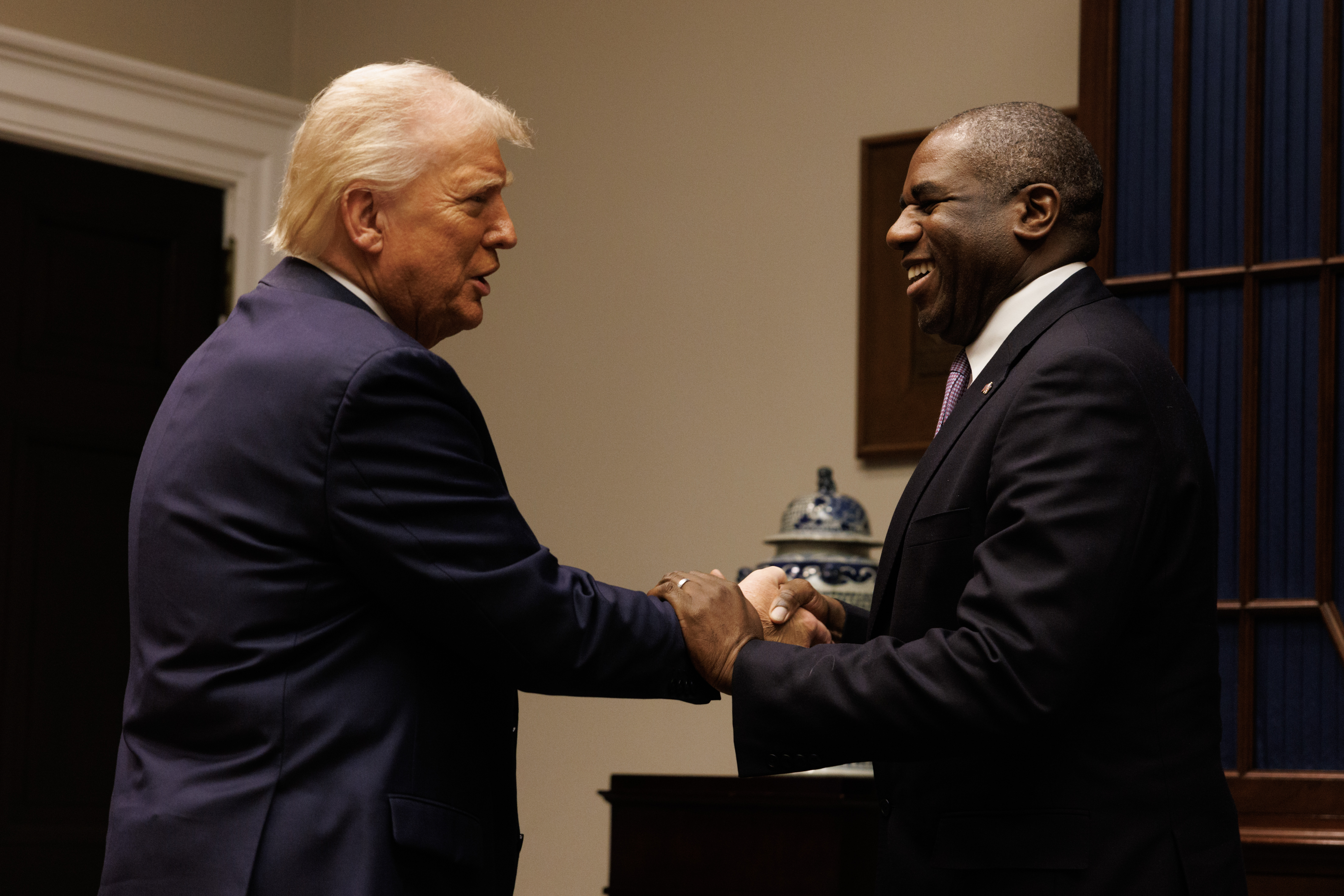
Lammy with US president Donald Trump at the White House in February 2025

On 14 August 2024, he met Saudi Arabia's Foreign Minister Prince Faisal bin Farhan Al Saud in London to discuss the growing UK–Saudi partnership. Lammy wrote on X: "We'll work together on shared defence, economic & security interests, including pressing for de-escalation in the region and a ceasefire and hostage release deal in Gaza."

Lammy visited the Norwegian Joint Headquarters in Bodø together with his Norwegian counterpart, Espen Barth Eide, to discuss deepening defence and security ties with the country and tackling threats from Russia.

On 19 September 2024 Lammy sparked a diplomatic row with Armenia because of a reference to the Nagorno-Karabakh conflict in his blog post. He hailed Azerbaijan for being able "to liberate territory it lost in the early 1990s". His remarks were described as "callous", as he referred to what has been described as ethnic cleansing of the indigenous Christian population of the region as "liberation", and "ignorant" because of the parallels he drew between Azerbaijan under Ilham Aliyev (a dictatorship in allied relations with Russia) and Ukraine, which is fighting against Russia.

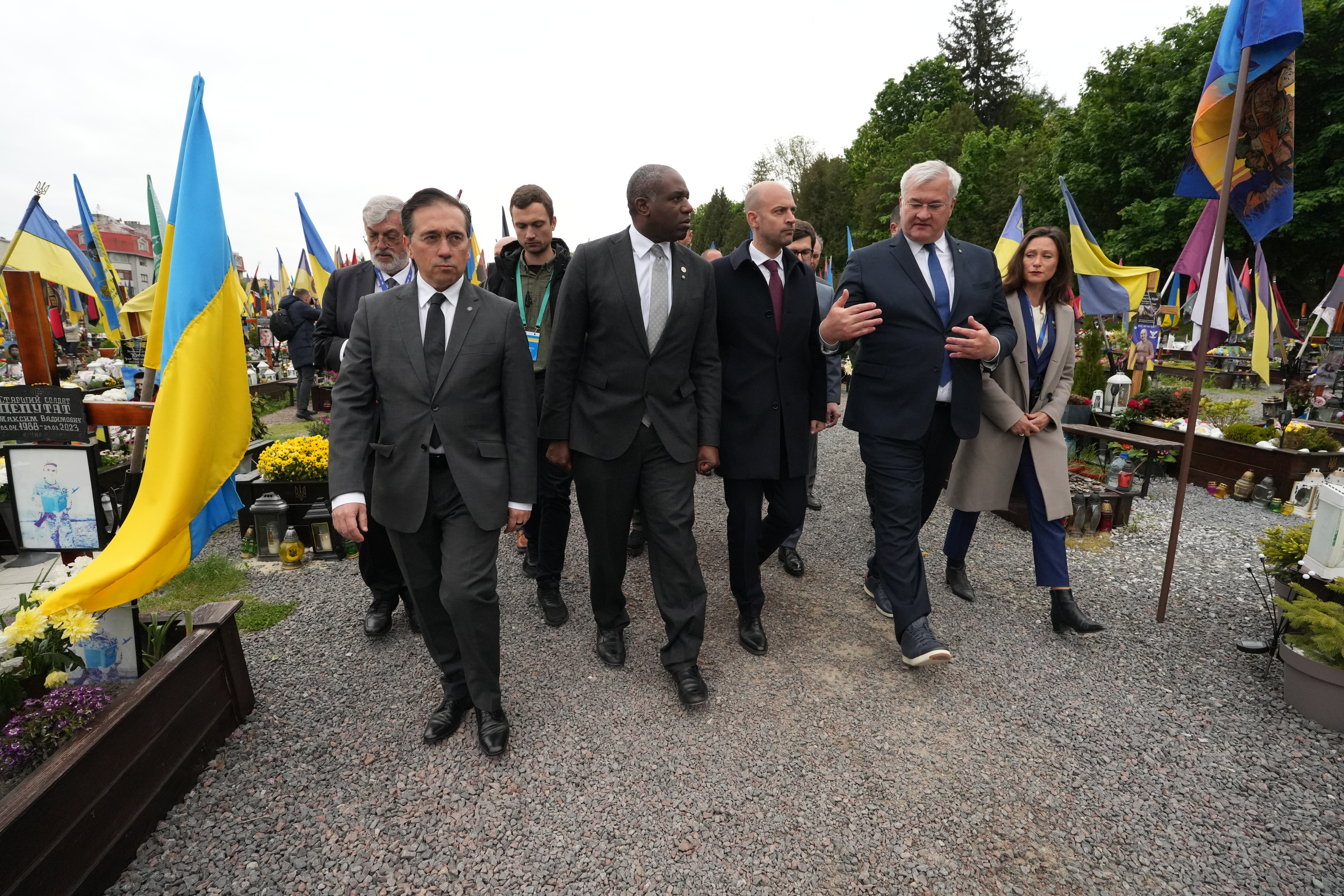
Lammy at the Lychakiv Cemetery in Lviv, Ukraine, to honor Ukrainian soldiers killed in the Russo-Ukrainian war, 9 May 2025

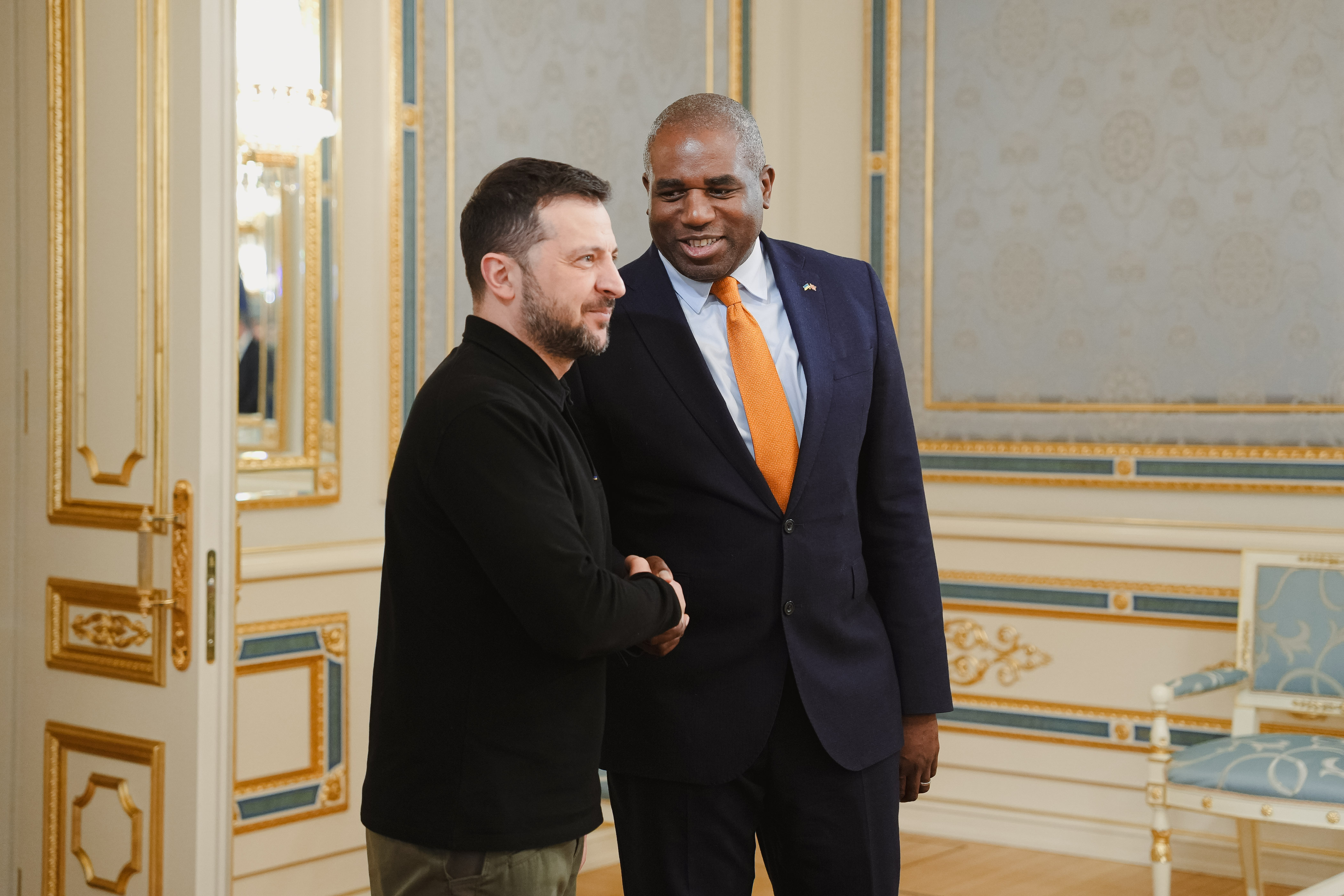
Lammy with Ukrainian president Volodymyr Zelenskyy in February 2025

Following the UK's decision to relinquish control of the Chagos Islands, Lammy asserted that this did not signal a shift in the government's position on other overseas territories. He furthermore stated that the status of the Falkland Islands and Gibraltar were "non-negotiable".

In November 2024, following the issuance by the International Criminal Court (ICC) of an arrest warrant against Benjamin Netanyahu for alleged war crimes in Gaza, Lammy clarified that he considered there to be no discretion for him but to implement the warrant. His position contrasted with France's view that Netanyahu benefited from immunity from the ICC.

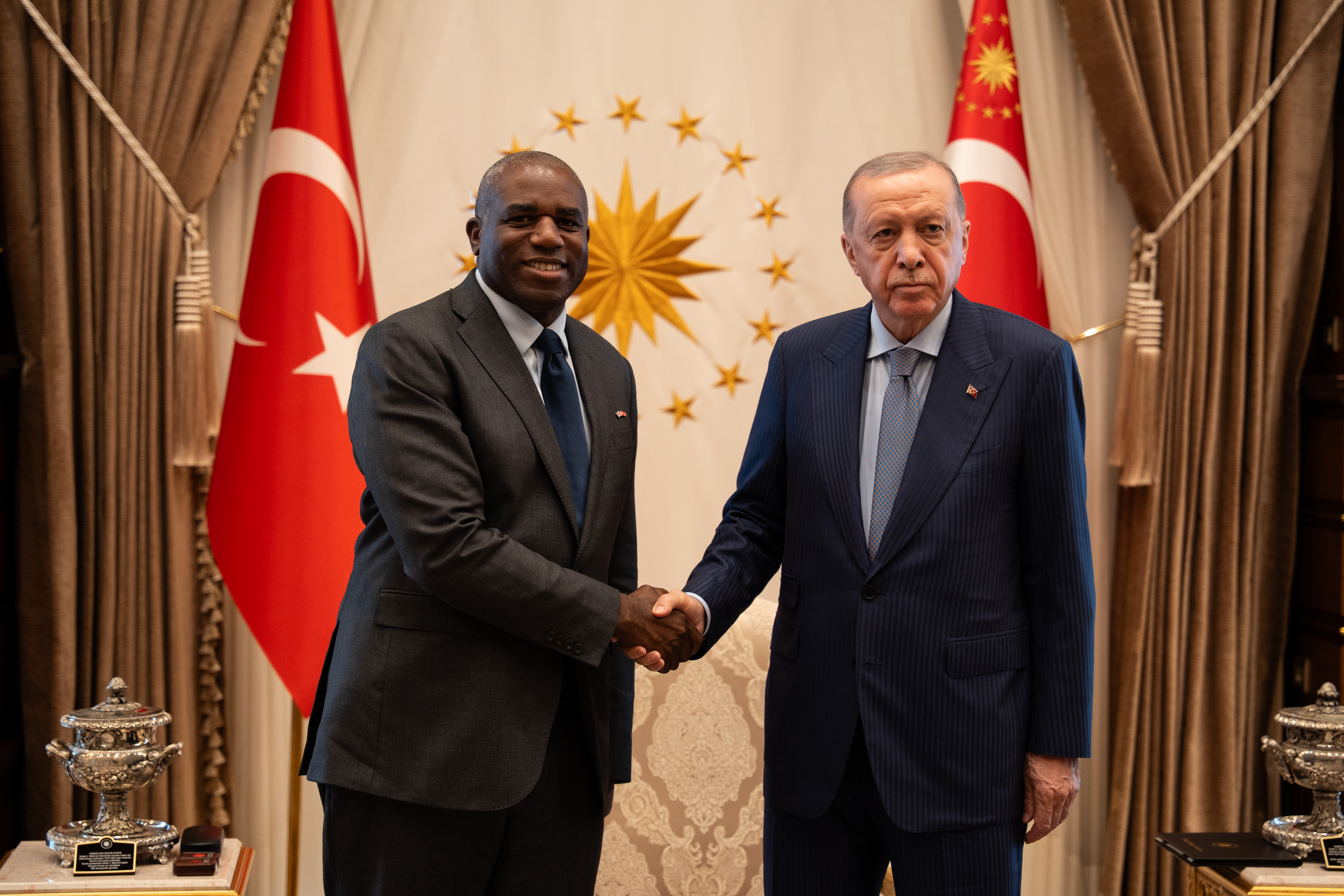
Lammy with Turkish president Recep Tayyip Erdoğan in June 2025

On 9 March 2025, Lammy condemned the massacres of Syrian minorities committed by pro-government fighters during clashes in western Syria, saying that the Syrian transitional government "must ensure the protection of all Syrians and set out a clear path to transitional justice." On 17 March 2025, in response to questions asked of him in the House of Commons, Lammy twice stated that Israel's 16-day blockade of humanitarian supplies into Gaza was a "breach" of international law. This was the first time that a member of the UK Government had stated that Israel was in breach of international law. However, Starmer's office publicly rejected Lammy's statement that Israel had broken international law by blocking Gaza. Starmer's office stated that it was up to the Foreign Office to decide whether Lammy should apologise for his criticism of Israel. On 18 March 2025, Lammy told Bloomberg it was a "matter for the court" to decide if Israel had breached international law. On 23 June 2025, Lammy declined to comment on whether the UK government considered the US strikes on Iranian nuclear sites to be illegal.

In 2025 Lammy faced criticism over the UK government's relations with the United Arab Emirates during the Sudanese civil war. Reports questioned the government's decision to invite the UAE to a London conference on Sudan despite allegations that it had supplied arms to the Rapid Support Forces (RSF). Separate media reports alleged that Foreign Office officials had sought to discourage criticism of the UAE at the United Nations over its alleged support for the RSF.

=== Deputy Prime Minister, Justice Secretary and Lord Chancellor ===
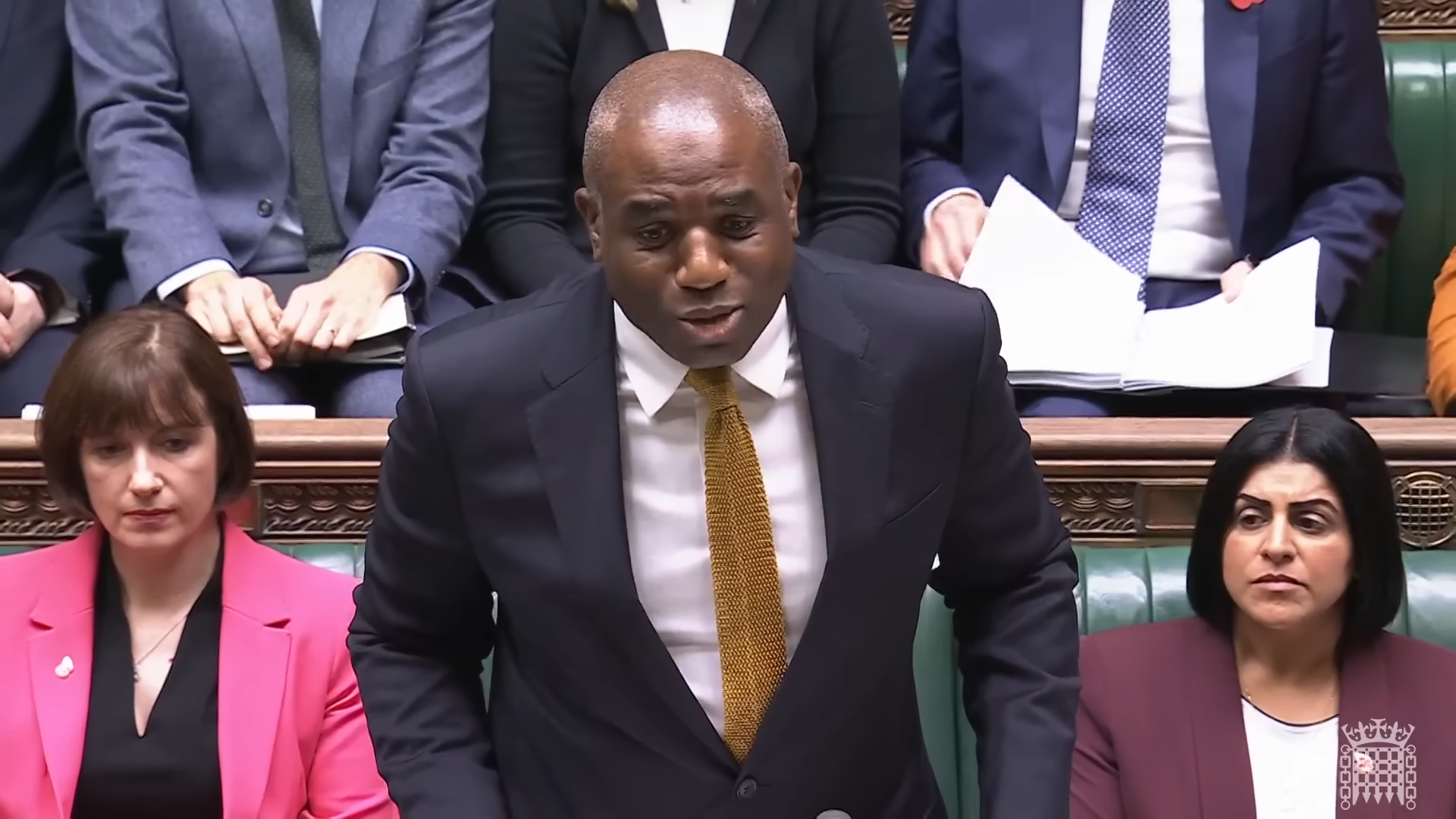
Lammy during deputy PMQs in November 2025

Following the resignation of Angela Rayner, Lammy became Deputy Prime Minister of the United Kingdom, Secretary of State for Justice and Lord Chancellor in the 2025 cabinet reshuffle on 5 September 2025.

After the resignation of Starmer in June 2026, Lammy endorsed Andy Burnham in the 2026 Labour Party leadership election. On 20 July 2026, Burnham dismissed Lammy from the government.

== Political views ==
=== Crime ===
Lammy has talked about black and minority ethnic people, in particular younger people, with regard to their relation with crime and how they are treated by the criminal justice system.

On 11 August 2011, in an address to Parliament, Lammy attributed part of the cause for England's riots of a few days earlier to destructive "cultures" that had emerged under the prevailing policies. He also stated that legislation restricting the degree of violence that parents are allowed to use when disciplining their children was partly to blame for current youth culture, that had contributed to the riots.

In September 2017 Lammy stated that the criminal justice system deals with "disproportionate numbers" of young people from black and ethnic minority communities: despite saying that although decisions to charge were "broadly proportionate", he asserted that black and ethnic minority people still face and perceive bias. Lammy said that young black people are nine times more likely to be incarcerated than "comparable" white people, and proposed a number of measures including a system of "deferred prosecution" for young first time offenders to reduce incarcerations. Lammy has claimed that black and ethnic minority people offend "at the same rates" as comparable white people "when taking age and socioeconomic status into account"; however, they were more likely to be stopped and searched, if charged, more likely to be convicted, more likely to be sent to prison and less likely to get support in prison.

In 2018 Lammy blamed the then-Prime Minister Theresa May, Home Secretary Amber Rudd, and London Mayor Sadiq Khan for failing to take responsibility over fatal stabbings in London. He also criticised inequality, high youth unemployment among black males, and local authorities cutting youth services and outreach programmes.

=== Issues of race, prejudice and equality ===
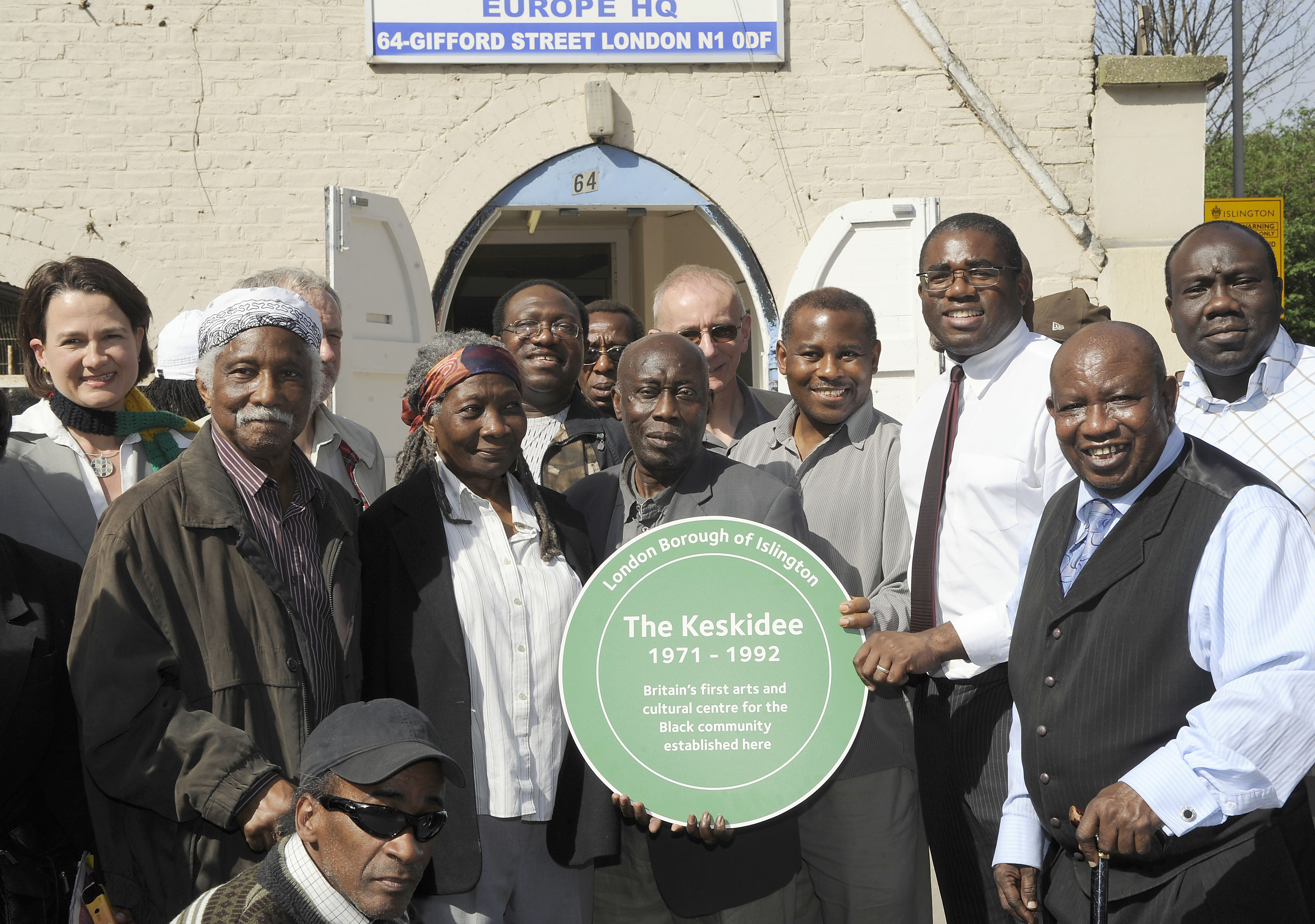
Lammy at the Keskidee Centre in Islington, 2011

Lammy has commented on Britain's history of slavery. He has also criticised the University of Oxford for admitting relatively few black students and students from disadvantaged backgrounds. He believes the Windrush scandal concerns injustice to a generation who are British, have made their homes and worked in Britain and deserve to be treated better.

On 5 February 2013 Lammy gave a speech in the House of Commons on why he would be voting in favour of the Marriage (Same Sex Couples) Bill, critically comparing the relegation of British same-sex couples to civil partnerships to the "separate but equal" legal doctrine that justified Jim Crow laws in the 20th-century United States.

In January 2016 Lammy was commissioned by then-Prime Minister David Cameron to report on the effects of racial discrimination and disadvantage on the procedures of the police, courts, prisons and the probation service. Lammy published his report in September 2017, concluding that prosecutions against some BAME suspects should be delayed or dropped outright to mitigate racial bias.

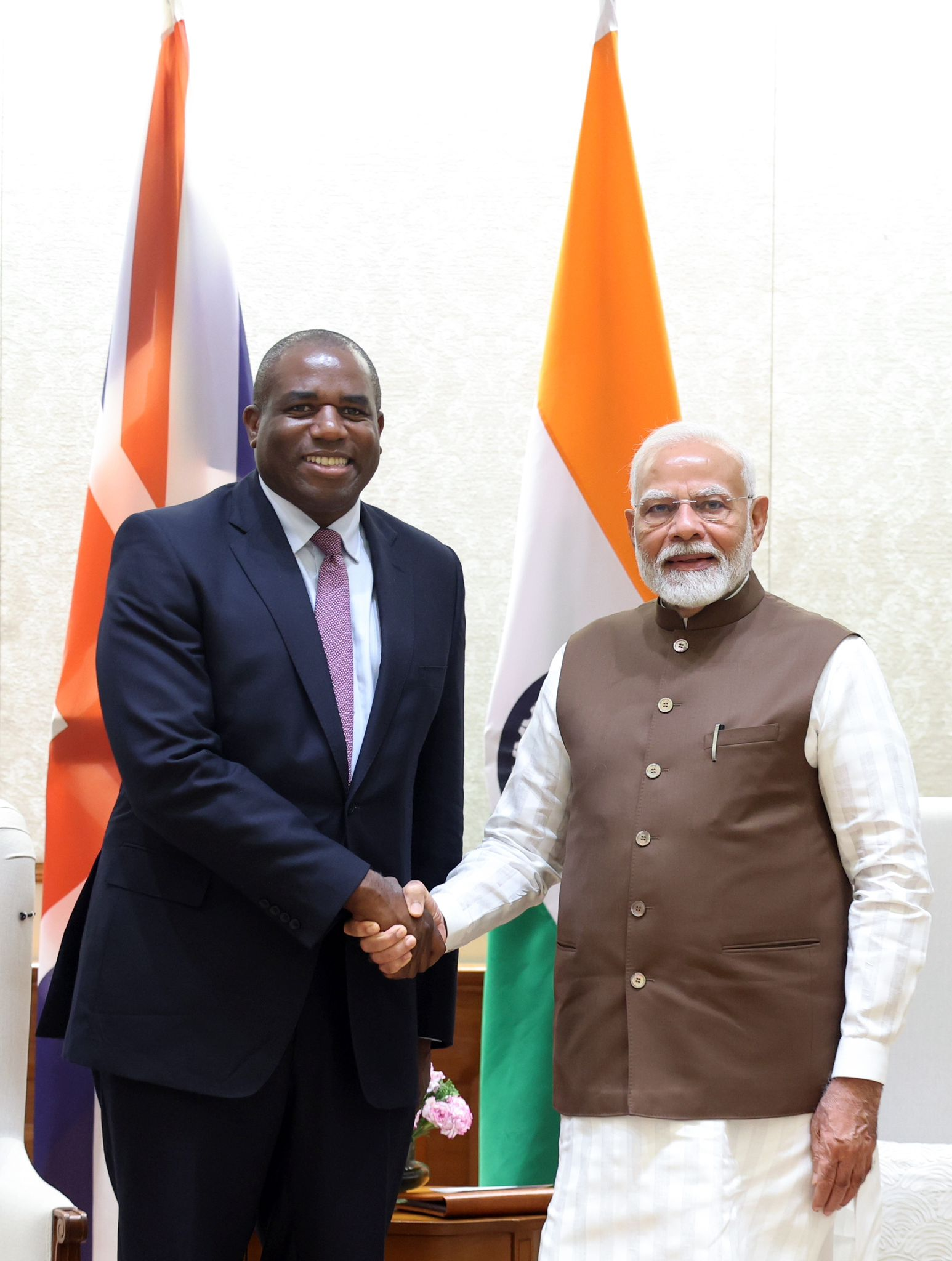
Lammy with Indian Prime Minister Narendra Modi in July 2024

In the same month, Lammy said one million Indians sacrificed their lives during the Second World War for the "European Project"; the statement was criticised by The Spectator.

He has spoken out against antisemitism within the Labour Party, and attended an Enough is Enough rally. At the rally, Lammy stated that antisemitism has "come back because extremism has come back" and is damaging support for Labour among Britain's Jewish community.

In January 2019 Lammy described Rod Liddle having a column in a weekly newspaper as a "national disgrace" and accused Liddle of having "white middle class privilege" for expressing the view that absent fathers played a role in violent crime involving black youths. Lammy made the same argument as Liddle – that absent fathers are a 'key cause of knife crime' – in 2012. Writing in an article for The Spectator, Liddle disputed Lammy's claim that he was raised in a family reliant on tax credits, which were not introduced in the United Kingdom until Lammy was aged 31.

Lammy recorded a Channel 4 documentary for Remembrance Sunday called The Unremembered: Britain's Forgotten War Heroes, which was broadcast on 10 November 2019. In it he reveals how Africans who died in their own continent serving Britain during WWI were denied the honour of an individual grave, despite the Commonwealth War Graves Commission's reputation for equality. The documentary was produced by Professor David Olusoga's production company; Olusoga described the failure to commemorate black and Asian soldiers as one of the "biggest scandals" he had ever come across.

The documentary inspired an investigation by the Commonwealth War Graves Commission. The subsequent report found that "pervasive racism" underpinned the failure to properly commemorate service personnel. The report stated that up to 54,000 casualties of "certain ethnic groups" did not receive the same remembrance treatment as white soldiers who had died and another 350,000 military personnel recruited from east Africa and Egypt were not commemorated by name or even at all. In April 2021, Prime Minister Boris Johnson offered an "unreserved apology" over the findings of the review. Secretary of State for Defence Ben Wallace apologised in the House of Commons, promising to make amends and take action. Lammy, who was critical to bringing the matter to light, called this a "watershed moment".

=== Home Office security ===
In October 2022 Lammy called for a full investigation into an alleged security breach by Suella Braverman. Lammy said: "The home secretary is the most serious job you could have in our state. This is a person who makes judgements about terrorism and counter-terrorism, who makes judgements about very, very serious offenders, whether they should be allowed out of prison, and for that reason, it's someone who, I'm afraid, judgement is critically important. I'm afraid this is a lapse of judgement that, quite rightly, she was sacked for. The question is, why was she brought back?"

=== Foreign policy ===
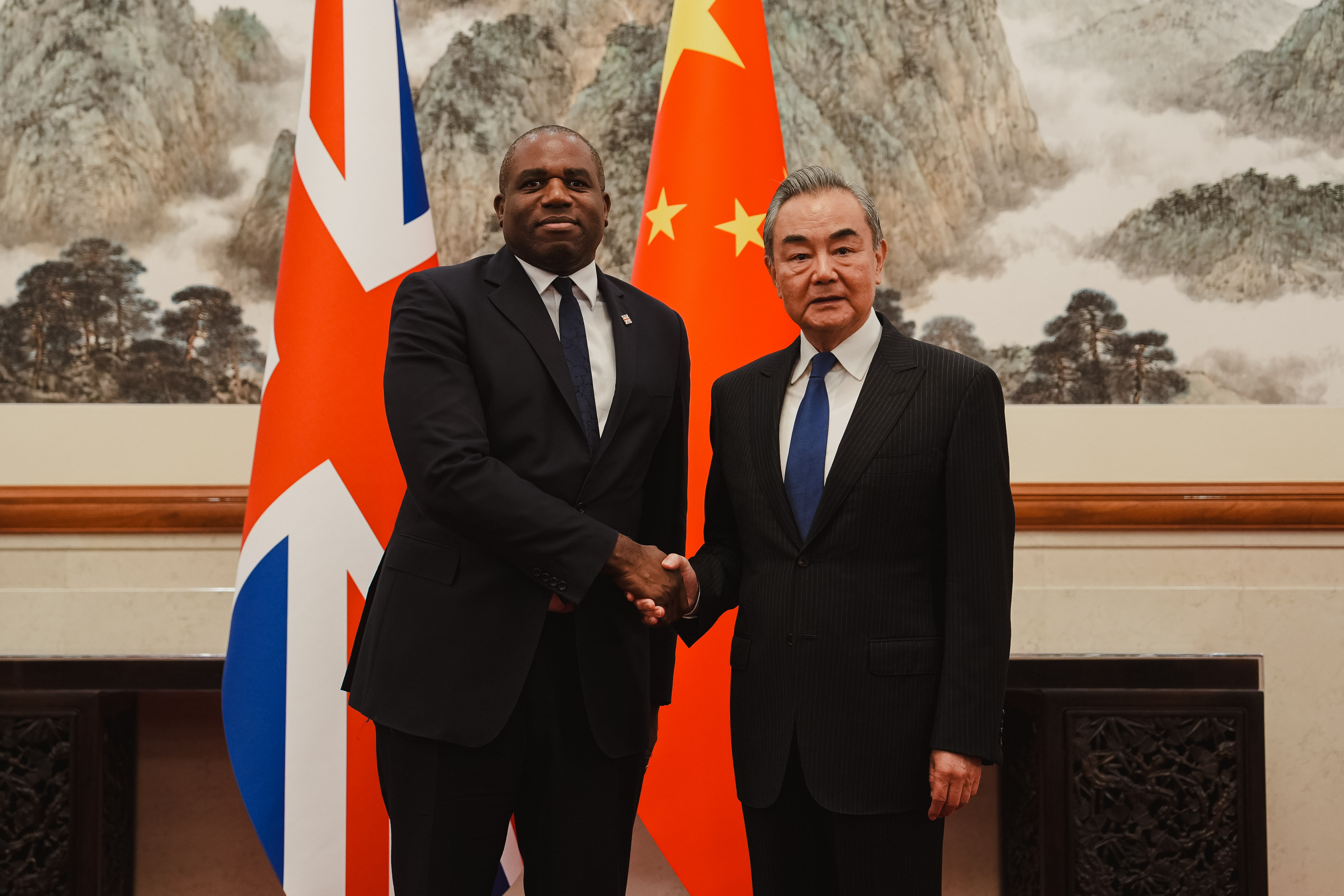
Lammy with Chinese foreign minister Wang Yi in Beijing, 18 October 2024

Lammy is an advocate of British membership of the European Union. On 23 June 2018, he appeared at the People's Vote march in London to mark the second anniversary of the referendum to leave the European Union. The People's Vote was a campaign group calling for a public vote on the final Brexit deal between the UK and the European Union. On 30 December 2020, he voted for the Brexit deal negotiated by Boris Johnson's Government.

In 2017 Lammy said the Rohingya people in Myanmar "are facing genocide". In December 2021, he described the persecution of Uyghurs in China as "genocide".

In April 2019 Lammy was criticised for saying his comparison of the European Research Group (which consists of Conservative MPs) to Nazis and proponents of the South African apartheid was "not strong enough".

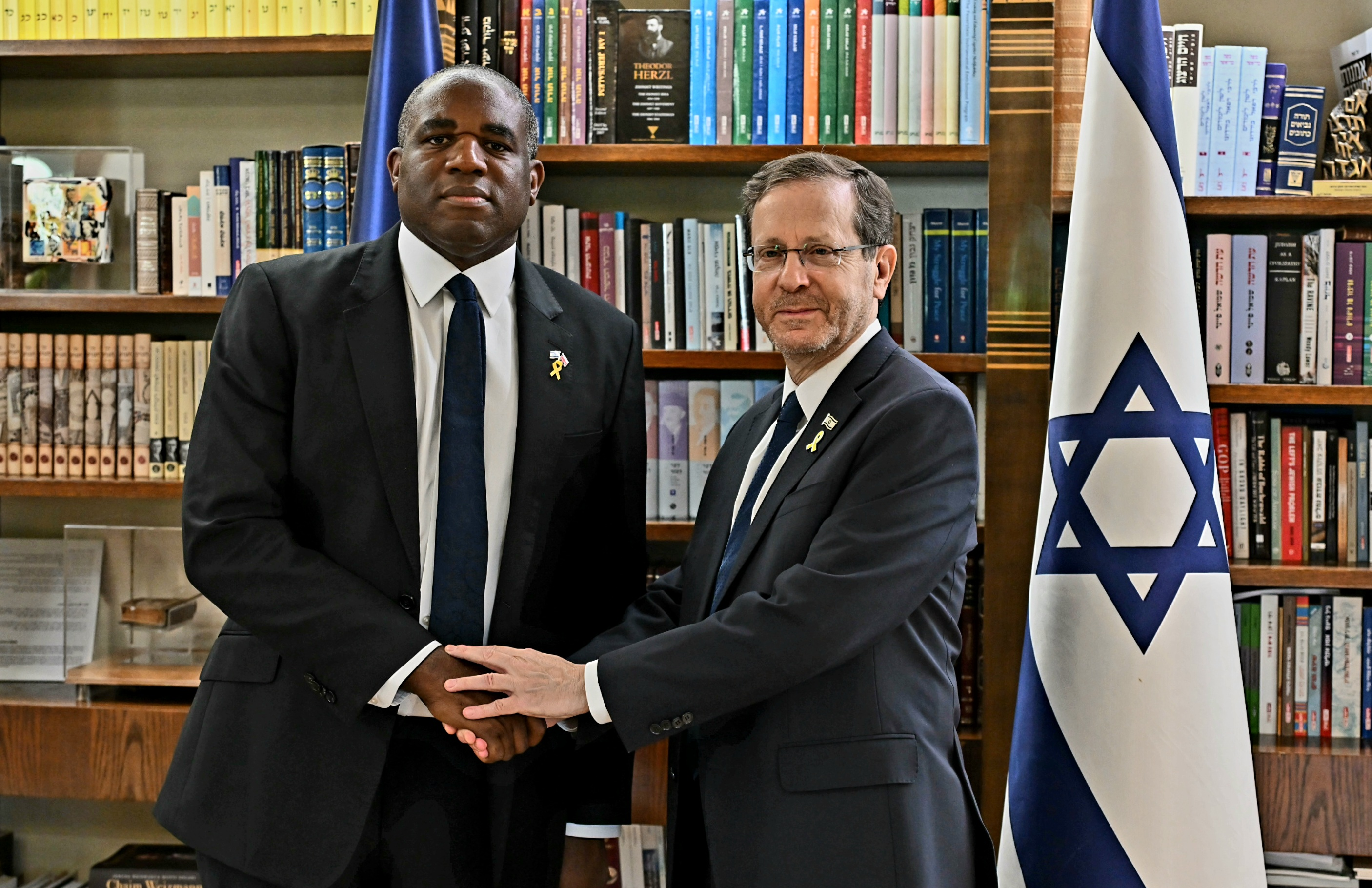
Lammy with Israeli president Isaac Herzog in July 2024

In late 2023, following an IDF bombing of the Jabalia refugee camp, Lammy commented that the strike was wrong "when it comes to the ethics," but also that "if there is a military objective it can be legally justifiable". The comments were criticised by the Muslim Association of Britain as shameful and morally depraved.

Lammy is a supporter of Israel. In September 2024 he described himself as a "liberal, progressive Zionist". He opposes a full arms embargo on Israel. On 8 October 2023, he signed a letter, alongside over 300 other MPs, condemning Hamas' attack the previous day as 'unprovoked'. In October 2024, Lammy stated that describing Israel's actions in Gaza as a genocide "undermines the seriousness of that term", leading MP Chris Law to state the comment revealed Lammy's "blatant contempt for the fundamental rights and the very lives of Palestinians." Lammy went on to condemn Israel's siege of Gaza, describing it as 'abhorrent' and 'extremist' in May 2025. However, he is yet to refer to Israel's actions as a genocide. He supported the export of F-35 parts to Israel. As of 3 August 2025, Lammy has received at least £32,640 from the Israel Lobby according to Declassified UK.

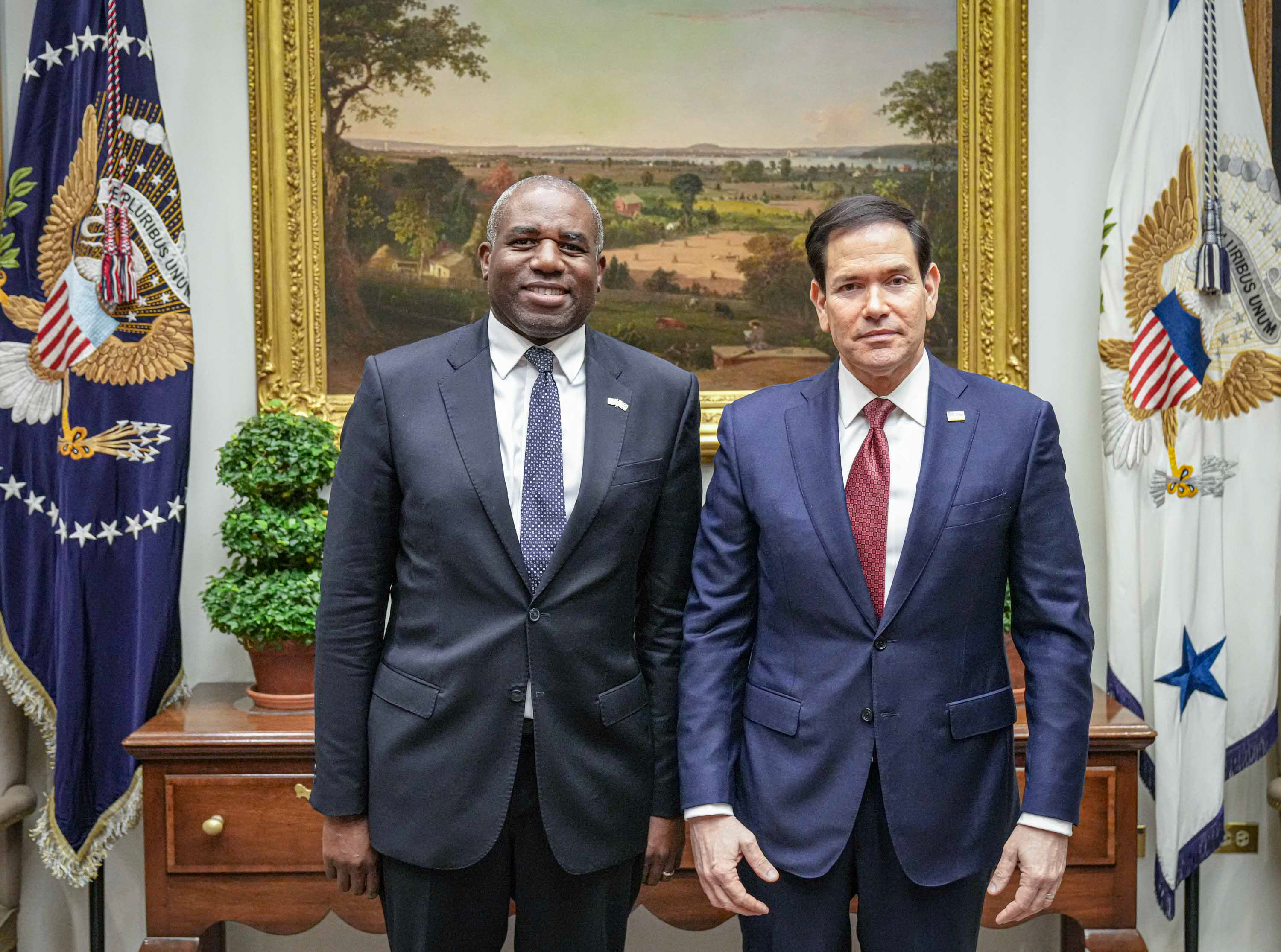
Lammy and Secretary of State Marco Rubio in April 2026

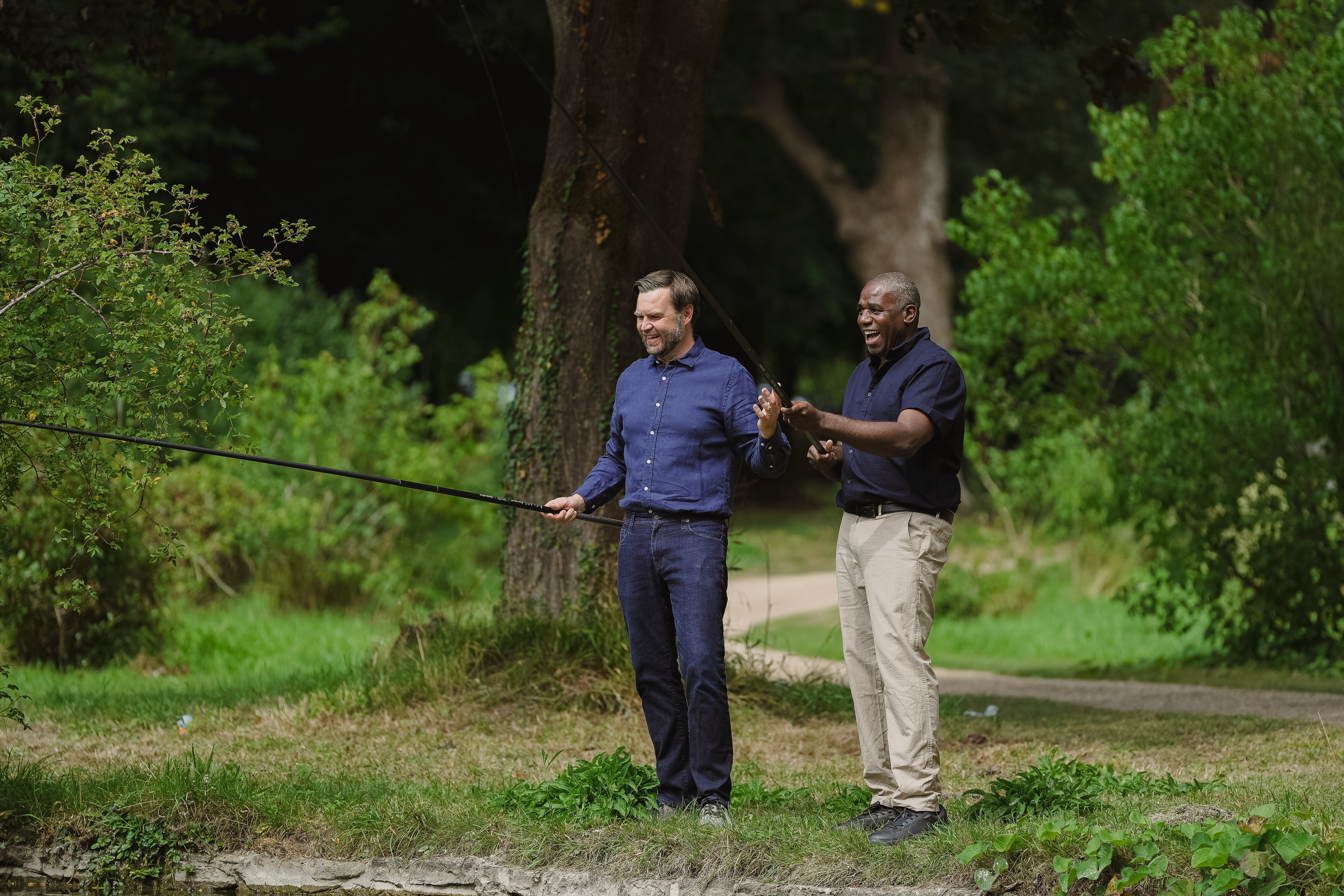
Lammy with JD Vance at Chevening House in August 2025

Lammy has stressed wanting to maintain a strong relationship with the United States. On a trip to Washington D.C. in May 2024, Lammy spoke at the Hudson Institute where he described himself as a "good Christian" and "small-c conservative" who had common cause with the U.S. Republican Party.

Lammy wrote in a Substack post in September 2024 that "Azerbaijan has been able to liberate territory it lost in the early 1990s" in reference to the 2023 Azerbaijani offensive in Nagorno-Karabakh, which resulted in the exodus of the Armenian population. The Foreign Office clarified that his comment did not mark a change in the UK government's stance on Nagorno-Karabakh, but Armenia asked for further clarification. Lammy's description of the event was widely criticised. Conservative MP Alicia Kearns said Lammy's comments are "totally inappropriate and throws into question the foreign secretary's judgment". US congressman Brad Sherman said the remarks were "a stain on UK foreign policy" and accused Lammy of having "endorsed ethnic cleansing". Laurence Broers, a scholar of the Caucasus, called Lammy's remarks "poorly informed" as Azerbaijan, in addition to recovering territory, "enacted a sustained campaign aimed at cleansing the territory of its ethnic Armenian population—and succeeded." Elin Suleymanov, Azerbaijan's ambassador to the UK, said Lammy's remarks are "absolutely true".

=== Other views ===
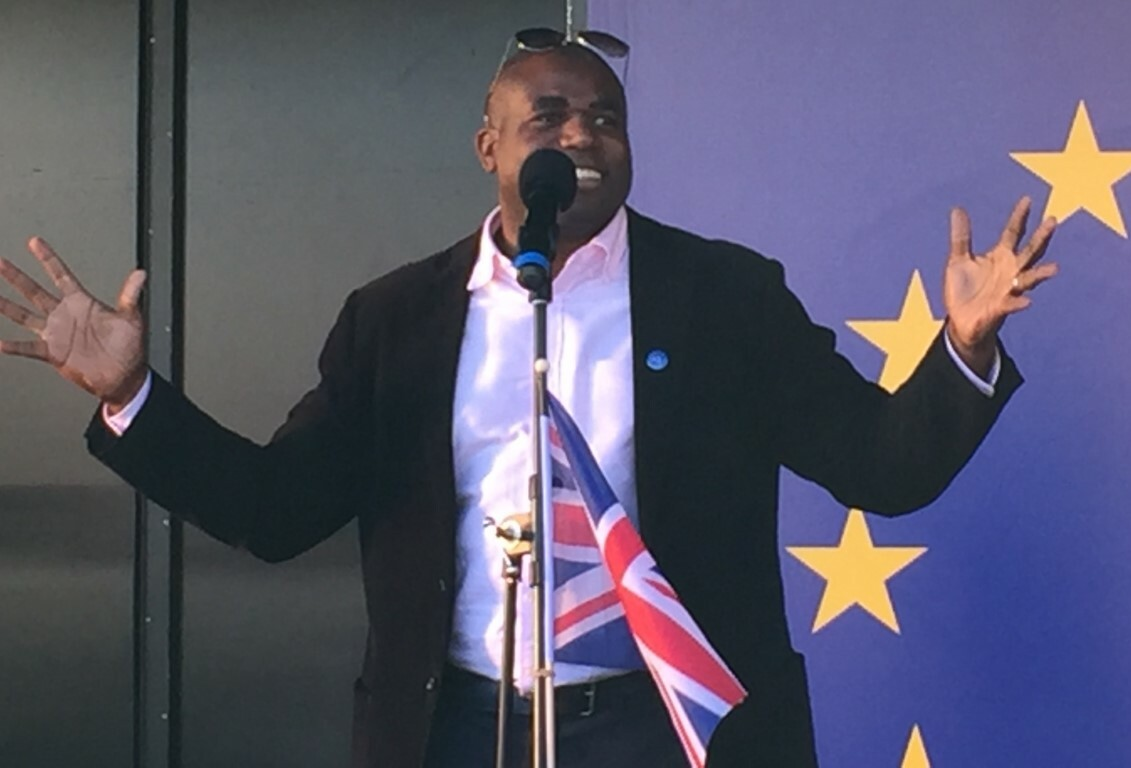
Lammy speaking at an anti-Brexit rally in Parliament Square on 25 March 2017

In Lammy's book, Out of the Ashes, Lammy stated in reference to the 2011 England riots that, "If parents were allowed to hit their children, the riots wouldn't have happened" and has said the ban on smacking children should be overturned.

Lammy described the Grenfell Tower fire as "corporate manslaughter" and called for arrests to be made; his friend Khadija Saye died in the fire. He also criticised the authorities for failing to say how many people had died. Reacting to the first official estimate of deaths, he said on 2 July 2017 "We know that 80 people have lost their lives but the view amongst the victims – I spoke to them yesterday – is that many more lost their lives." The official death toll for the fire is 72. He has written about what he believes to be the shortcomings of the housing market.

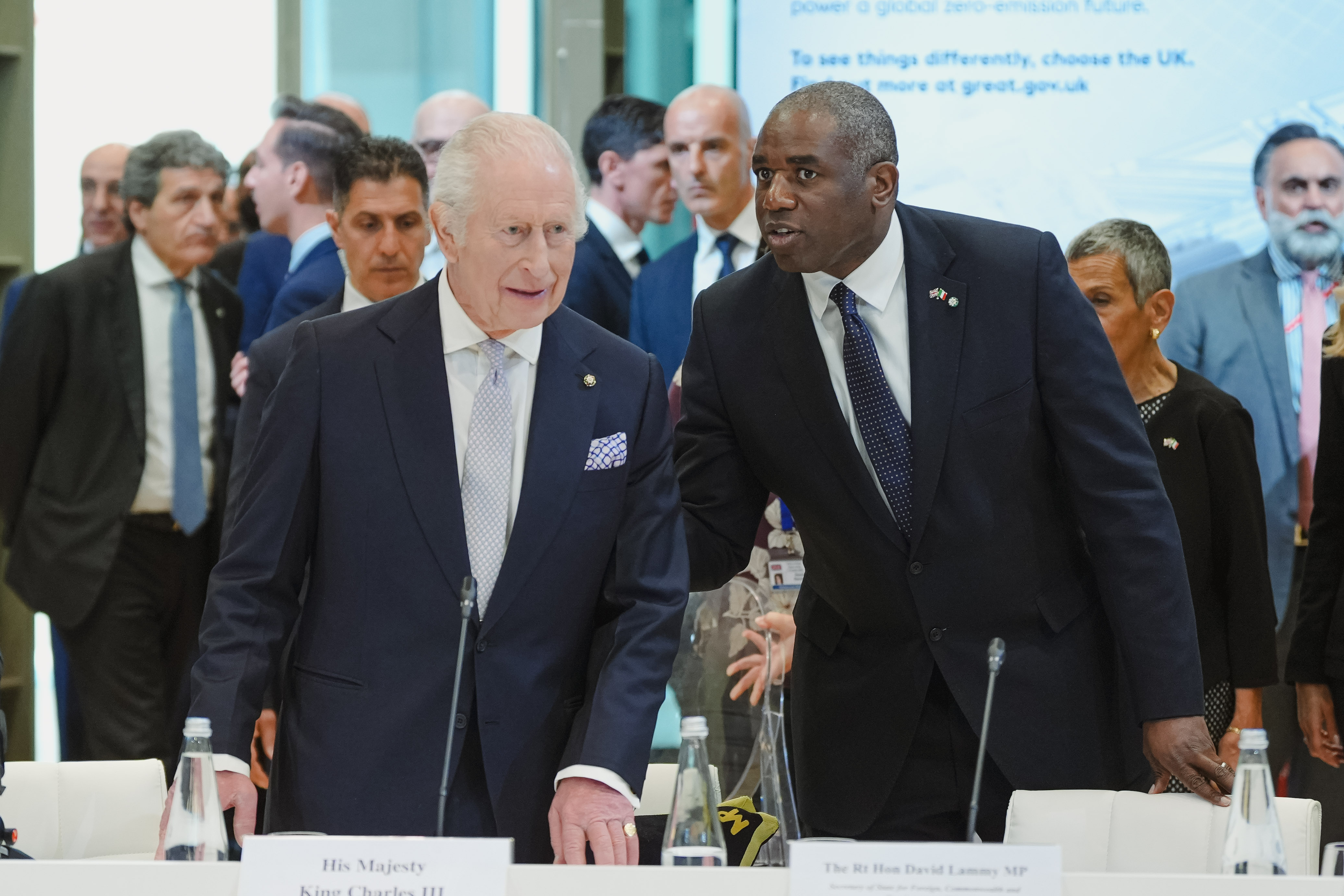
Lammy with Charles III in April 2025

Lammy supports shared parental leave, which he maintains would "normalise" fathers being an equal parent with the mother, and would mean they become more involved in the raising of children, arguing that the barriers to "fathers playing a deeper role in family life" are not just legislative, but also cultural. He points out Scandinavian countries such as Sweden as examples of where governments have successfully made this happen, which he states has also helped increase gender equality.

Lammy has called former Conservative Party Prime Minister, Margaret Thatcher a "visionary leader for the UK" and that, "You can take issue with Mrs Thatcher's prescription, but she had a big manifesto for change and set about a course that lasted for over two decades".

He is a member of the Fabian Society.

Lammy supports the legalisation and regulation of cannabis.

=== Stereotypes of Africa ===
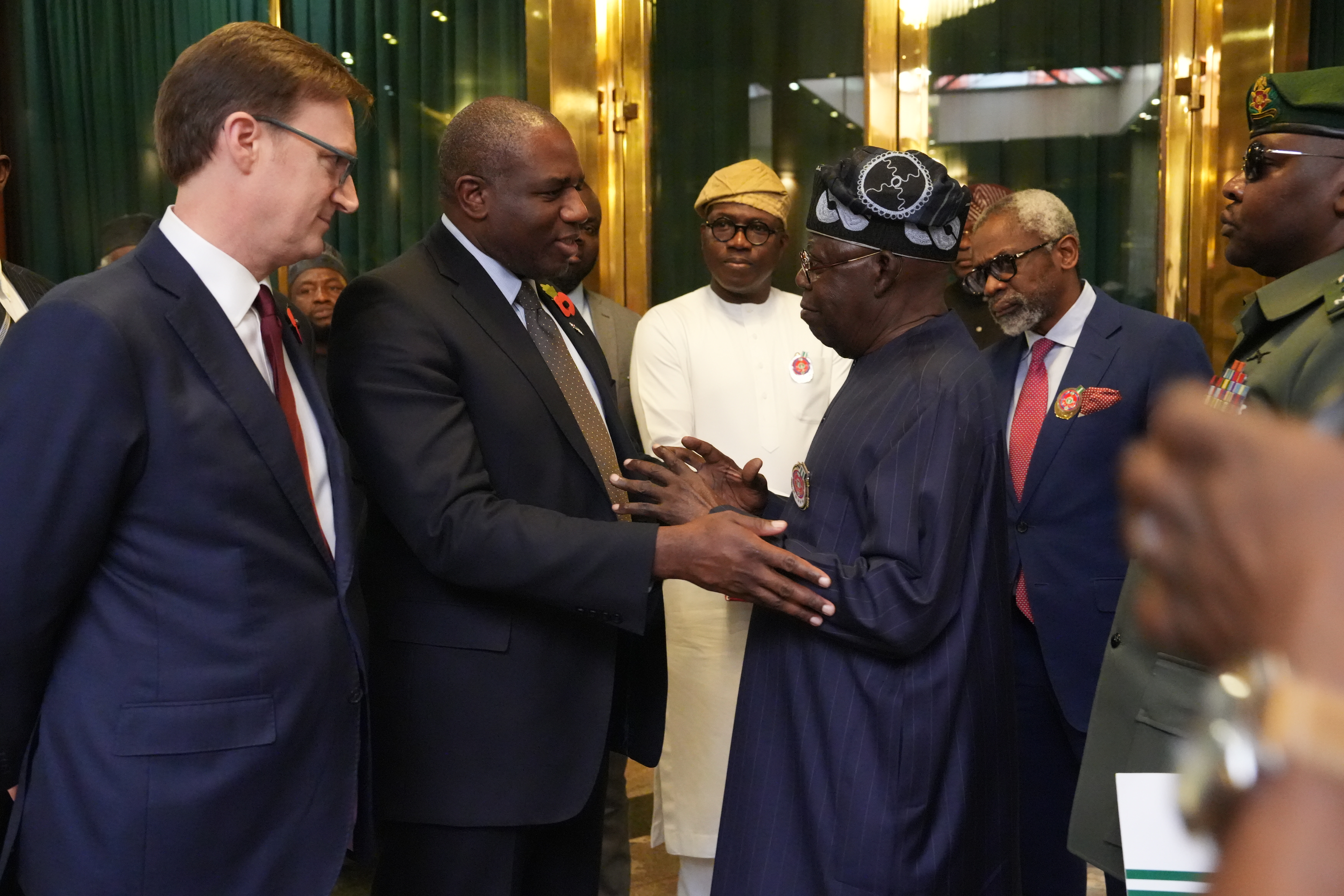
Lammy with Nigerian president Bola Tinubu in November 2024

In 2017, writing in The Guardian, Lammy argued that Comic Relief perpetuated problematic stereotypes of Africa, and that they had a responsibility to use its powerful position to move the debate on in a more constructive way by establishing an image of African people as equals. His comments came after a video featuring Ed Sheeran meeting and rescuing a child in Liberia was criticised as "poverty porn" and was given the "Rusty Radiator" award for the "most offensive and stereotypical fundraising video of the year". In 2018, in response to Lammy's comments and the backlash to Sheeran's video, Comic Relief announced they would take steps towards change by halting their use of celebrities for appeals.

In February 2019 Lammy criticised Stacey Dooley for photographs she posted on social media of her trip to Uganda for Comic Relief, and said that "the world does not need any more white saviours", and that she was "perpetuating 'tired and unhelpful stereotypes' about Africa". He also stated however, that he does not question her "good motives". The donations received for the Red Nose Day broadcast in March 2019 fell by £8 million and the money raised that year was the lowest since 2007, which some have blamed on Lammy's remarks. Critics of his view included Wikipedia founder Jimmy Wales and Conservative Party MP Chris Philp. Lammy responded to criticism with a statement in which he referred to the decline in donations being due to contributing factors of austerity, declining viewing figures, trends in the charity sector and format fatigue and that he hoped his comments "would inspire the charity to refresh its image and think harder about the effects its output has on our perceptions of Africa".

Following this, in October 2020, Comic Relief announced it would stop sending celebrities to Africa for its fundraising films. They stated that they would no longer send celebrities to Africa nor portray Africa with images of starving people or critically ill children, instead, they would be using local filmmakers to provide a more "authentic" perspective and give agency back to African people.

Lammy's wife is a co-founder and as at December 2022 a trustee for Sophia Point, an education and conservation charity working in Guyana.

== Personal life ==
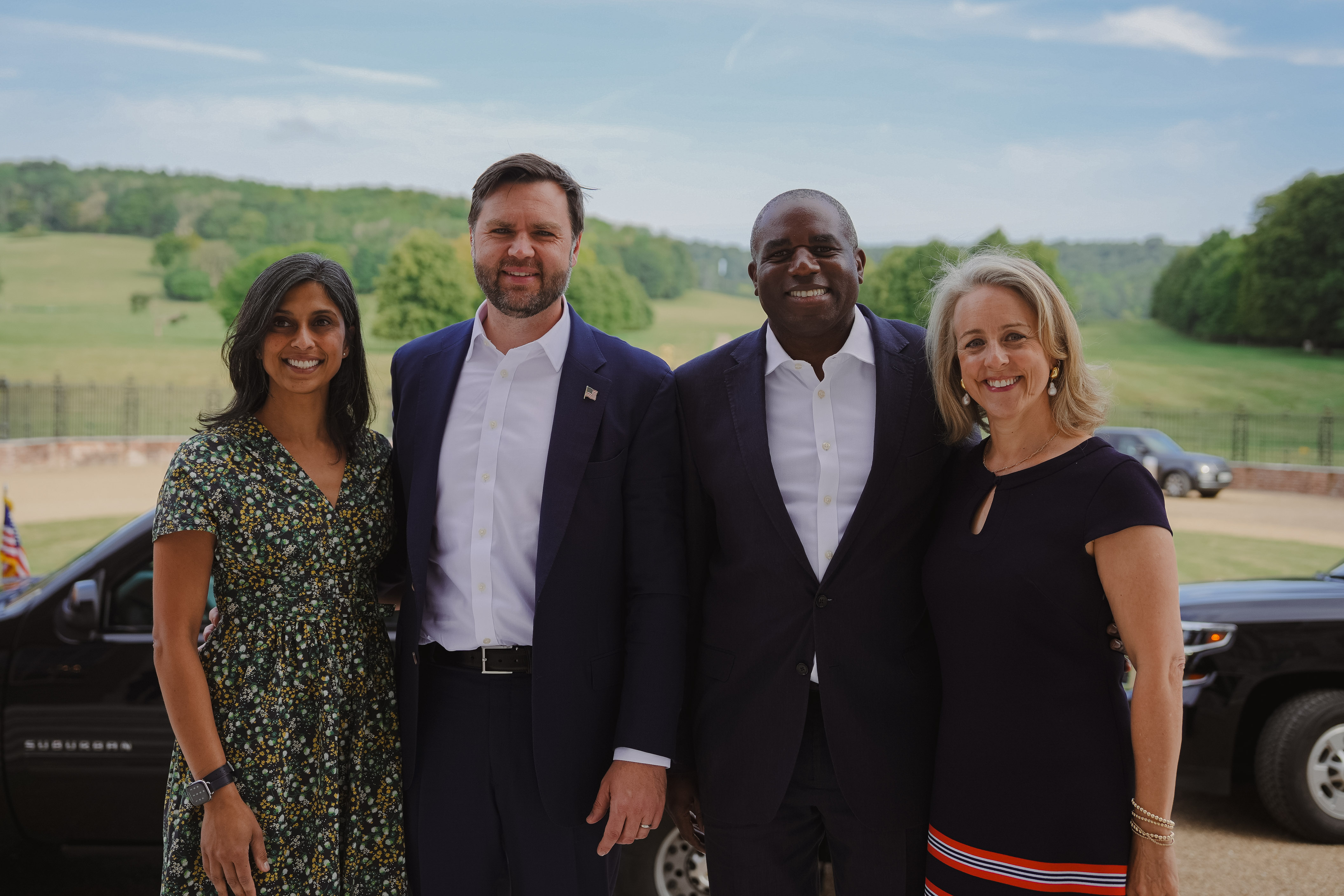
Lammy and his wife with JD Vance and Usha Vance in August 2025

Lammy married the artist Nicola Green, daughter of Sir Malcolm Green, in 2005; the couple have two sons and an adopted daughter.

Lammy is an Anglican and is part of the liberal Anglo-Catholic tradition in the Church of England. His wife, of Ashkenazi Jewish, Russian Orthodox and Anglican heritage, explored atheism and then other religions before returning to her Anglican faith; the couple married under CofE aegis, with Archbishop Desmond Tutu sending a prayer to be read at the wedding.

He is a Tottenham Hotspur F.C. fan, and enjoys film and the theatre.

He holds dual citizenship of the United Kingdom and Guyana. His great-grandmother was Indian, from Calcutta, who moved to Guyana as a labourer as part of the Indian indenture system. At Prime Minister's Questions on 5 November 2025, David Lammy stated he had taken a DNA test and was five percent Scottish.

Lammy features as one of the 100 Great Black Britons on both the 2003 and 2020 lists. He has regularly been included in the Powerlist as one of the most influential people in the UK of African/African-Caribbean descent, including the most recent editions published in 2020 and 2021.

In 2009 Lammy took part in the BBC television quiz show Celebrity Mastermind, scoring 13 points. His five points in the general knowledge round followed the suggestion that King Henry VII succeeded Henry VIII.

In November 2011 he published a book, Out of the Ashes: Britain After the Riots, about the 2011 England riots. In 2020, he published his second book, Tribes, which explored social division and the need for belonging.

Lammy was a stand-in presenter on LBC and hosted a weekly Sunday show, from 10 am to 1 pm, between 2022 and April 2024.

During the 2019–2024 parliament, Lammy received a total of £202,599 over and above his MP's salary, from 40 different sources, the highest of all Labour Party MPs.

== Honours ==
- He was sworn in as a member of the Privy Council in 2008. This gave him the honorific prefix "The Right Honourable" for life.
- He has been elected as a Fellow of the Royal Society of Arts; this gave him the Post Nominal Letters "FRSA" for as long as he remains a Fellow.

== Notes ==
Parliament of the United Kingdom
Preceded by Bernie Grant	Member of Parliament for Tottenham; 2000–present	Incumbent
Preceded by Chris Leslie	Baby of the House; 2000–2003	Succeeded by Sarah Teather
Political offices
Preceded by Estelle Morris as Minister of State for the Arts	Minister of State for Culture; 2005–2007	Succeeded by Margaret Hodge as Minister of State for Culture and Tourism
Preceded by Bill Rammell	Minister of State for Innovation, Universities and Skills; 2007–2010	Succeeded by David Willetts as Minister of State for Universities and Science
Preceded by Richard Burgon	Shadow Secretary of State for Justice; 2020–2021	Succeeded by Steve Reed
Preceded by Richard Burgon	Shadow Lord Chancellor; 2020–2021	Succeeded by Steve Reed
Preceded by Lisa Nandy	Shadow Foreign Secretary; 2021–2024	Succeeded by Andrew Mitchell
Preceded by David Cameron	Foreign Secretary; 2024–2025	Succeeded by Yvette Cooper
Preceded by Shabana Mahmood	Secretary of State for Justice; 2025–2026	Succeeded by Alex Norris
Preceded by Shabana Mahmood	Lord High Chancellor of Great Britain; 2025–2026	Succeeded by Alex Norris
Preceded by Angela Rayner	Deputy Prime Minister of the United Kingdom; 2025–2026	Vacant
