= Asthma + Lung UK =

British charity

- Asthma and Lung UK
- Formation: 1 January 2020; 6 years ago
- Merger of: Asthma UK; British Lung Foundation
- Type: Charitable organisation
- Registration no.: England and Wales: 326730; Scotland: SC038415; Isle of Man: 1177
- Purpose: Health policy
- Headquarters: The White Chapel Building, 10 Whitechapel High Street, London, E1 8QS
- Coordinates: 51.5145°N 0.0728°W
- Patron: The Duchess of Gloucester
- Key people: Sarah Sleet (CEO); Tamara Ingram (Chair); Professor Ian Hall (Vice Chair)
- Revenue: £15 million (2022/23)
- Employees: 300 (2023)
- Volunteers: 179 (2023)
- Website: https://www.asthmaandlung.org.uk/
- Formerly called: Asthma UK and British Lung Foundation Partnership

Asthma + Lung UK (formally Asthma and Lung UK) is a British charity based in London, England. It focuses on respiratory health in adults and children, in particular asthma and COPD, as well as other lung conditions including pulmonary fibrosis, bronchiectasis and obstructive sleep apnoea.

The organisation was formed in January 2020 as Asthma UK and the British Lung Foundation Partnership as a result of a merger between Asthma UK and the British Lung Foundation. On 24 February 2022, the charity announced that the organisation had been renamed to Asthma and Lung UK.

== History ==
The Asthma Research Council was founded in 1927. The first donation was used to pay for special asthma clinics at Guy's Hospital and Great Ormond Street Hospital. In 1989, the Council became the National Asthma Campaign, and in 2004, it changed its name to Asthma UK.

The British Lung Foundation was established by Professor Sir Malcolm Green and a group of British lung specialists in 1984.

In December 2019, Asthma UK and the British Lung Foundation announced that they had agreed to merge, to form Asthma UK and the British Lung Foundation Partnership. It was expected that the merged charity would save around £2 million a year in running costs compared to operating independently. Kay Boycott was appointed as the first chief executive of the partnership, having been the incumbent chief executive of Asthma UK at the time of the merger. The British Lung Foundation's records with the Charity Commission and Companies House were renamed and remain in use, while Asthma UK's records were left dormant. On 24 February 2022, the charity announced that the organisation had been renamed to Asthma and Lung UK, styled as Asthma + Lung UK.

Asthma + Lung UK appointed Sarah Sleet as its new chief executive officer in January 2024. She replaced Sarah Woolnough, who had been in post for the previous three years.

Asthma + Lung UK is a member of the Smokefree Action Coalition.

== Patient Information and Support ==
The charity provides a range of information for patients and carers. These include patient passports to help people identify what care the should have received. Self-management plans help to support day to day living with a lung condition, as well as how to deal with acute attacks (acute exacetbatiosn) when they occur.

Asthma + Lung UK provide a comprehensive range of inhaler technique videos. People using inhalers are advised to check their own technique agasint these at least twice a year to make sure they are getting the best out of their medication.

== Research ==
Asthma + Lung UK – and its previous incarnations – is known for the research it has been carrying out into asthma and lung disease for the past decades. It has informed a number of parliamentary debates on the issue.

Since 2012, Asthma UK has conducted an annual survey of people with asthma, looking into their experience of living with the condition and the care they receive. The survey has been taken over and continued by Asthma + Lung UK since the merger with the British Lung Foundation.

In 2014, Asthma UK founded the Centre for Applied Research in asthma at the University of Edinburgh. The Centre has been a regular participant in the Scottish Parliament's Cross-Party Group on Lung Health since its inception in 2021.

In 2018 the British Lung Foundation helped found the Taskforce for Lung Health, which brought together representatives from over 40 organisations in the sector to make recommendations on how to improve treatment for lung disease in the UK. In 2020, the taskforce revealed that lung patients' symptoms had improved during lockdown as a result of a drop in air pollution. However in 2021, it warned that one fifth of lung disease patients had to wait more than a year for a prognosis, and risked dying before they were even diagnosed.

In 2023, Asthma + Lung UK published research which suggested up to 750,000 people in England were being misdiagnosed with asthma, due to a lack of simple tests for common lung conditions. The research claimed these misdiagnoses cost the government an estimated £132 million each year.

Research published by the charity in 2024 showed that while deaths from asthma attacks were up by a quarter since 2010, two thirds of asthma deaths were preventable.

== Funding ==
From 2021 to 2022, Asthma + Lung UK raised £13.9 million. Of this amount, £5.1m came from legacies (37%), £4.3m from donations (31%), £1.4m from fundraising (10%), £1.3m from grants (9%), £0.5m from gifts in kind (4%), and £0.4m from its investment portfolio (3%).
