= Trichology =

Study of the hair and scalp

Trichology is the study of the hair and scalp. The term derives from Ancient Greek θρίξ (thríx), "hair" and -λογία -logia. In most jurisdictions the title of a trichologist, not the field of trichology, is considered a para-medical discipline.

The Institute of Trichologists was founded in 1902. The first journal for the field, International Journal of Trichology, was founded in 2009.

== Diseases ==
- Alopecia
  - Alopecia areata
  - Alopecia universalis
  - Frictional alopecia
  - Frontal fibrosing alopecia
  - Loose anagen syndrome
  - Pattern hair loss (Androgenic alopecia)
  - Scarring and non scarring hair loss
- Hair colour
  - Canities subita
  - Premature greying of hair
- The hair root & hair follicle disorders
  - Telogen effluvium
  - Trichostasis spinulosa
- Hirsutism
  - Trichomegaly
- Pathogenic
  - Microsporum audouinii
  - Piedraia hortae
  - Tinea capitis
  - Trichobacteriosis axillaris

== Diagnosis ==
- Blood test
  - Vitamin deficiency
- Hair analysis
  - Scalp Biopsy
- Hamilton–Norwood scale & Ludwig scale
- Trichoscopy

== Subspecialties ==
Trichology includes subspecialties that deal either with certain diseases or diseases of certain parts of the hair. Some of them are:

- Hair cloning
- Hair removal
- Management of hair loss
  - Hair transplantation

=== Cosmetic ===
- Hair care
  - Curly Girl Method
- Hygiene
  - Dry shampoo

== Treatment ==
- Collagen induction therapy
  - Microneedling
- Low-level laser therapy
- Platelet-rich plasma
- Oral or topical pharmaceuticals
  - Antiandrogen or 5α-Reductase inhibitor’s
    - Dutasteride, Finasteride
  - Antifungal
    - Ketoconazole
  - Antihypertensive
    - Minoxidil

== Trichology community ==
=== Associations ===
- International Association of Trichologists (IAT)
  - American Hair Research Society (AHRS)
  - Australasian Hair and Wool Research Society
  - European Hair Research Society (EHRS)
  - Hair Research Society of India
  - Korean Hair Research Society (KHRS)
  - Russian Hair Research Society (RHRS)
  - Society for Hair Research Japan
  - Ukraine Hair Research Society (UHRS)
  - World Congress for Hair Research
- The Institute of Trichologists
- International Society of Hair Restoration Surgery
- The Trichological Society

=== Journals ===
- International Journal of Trichology
- Trichology and Cosmetology

=== Notable trichologists ===
- Lidia Rudnicka
- Desmond Tobin
- Antonella Tosti
- Shuna Hammocks

==== Cosmetic ====
- Mark Constantine
- Philip Kingsley
