= Non-scarring hair loss =

Non scarring hair loss
- Other names: Noncicatricial alopecia
- Specialty: Dermatology

Non scarring hair loss, also known as noncicatricial alopecia, is the loss of hair without any scarring being present. There is typically little inflammation and irritation, but hair loss is significant. This is in contrast to scarring hair loss during which hair follicles are replaced with scar tissue as a result of inflammation. Hair loss may be spread throughout the scalp (diffuse) or at certain spots (focal). The loss may be sudden or gradual with accompanying stress.

The most common cause is androgenetic alopecia, also known as male pattern or female pattern hair loss due to the effects of dihydrotestosterone (DHT) on the hair follicles. A variety of factors may lead to this condition such as hormonal effects, age, diet, autoimmunity, emotional stress, physical stress, drug effects, genetics, or infections.

Depending on the cause, treatment options include: topical minoxidil, oral finasteride, anti-fungal medications, steroids, hair transplantation, or platelet rich plasma (PRP) therapy. Alternatives for total hair loss include the use of hairpieces or hair fibers.

== Signs and symptoms ==
Patients will notice either focal or diffuse loss of hair. This may occur due to thinning or shedding of the hair over a sudden or gradual period of time. Stress may be present, and the emotional impact of hair loss is important as it may cause significant distress. Other signs may point to specific causes of the condition. Poor diet may lead to tiredness, other side effects of chemotherapy drugs may be seen, infection can cause itching, stress may lead to pulling of hair or falling of hair. Hair loss may be present in the family, highlighting genetic causes.

== Causes ==
Causes of noncicatricial alopecia can be separated based on focal or diffuse hair loss:

Diffuse:

- Androgenetic alopecia: androgenic DHT leads to catagenic miniaturization of hair follicles.
- Diffuse alopecia areata: diffuse autoimmune destruction of hair follicles
- Alopecia totalis: unknown but thought to be autoimmune
- Telogen effluvium: emotional or physiologic stress
- Anagen effluvium: cancer treatments such as radiation and alkylating agents
- Dermatopathia pigmentosa reticularis: genetic autosomal dominant condition

Focal:

- Alopecia areata: autoimmune destruction of hair follicles
- Tinea capitis: fungal infection
- Traction alopecia: pulling force applied to hair
- Trichotillomania (Trichotillosis)

== Diagnosis ==
There are a number of conditions that may cause non scarring hair loss and the first step is to determine the pattern: focal or diffuse. The next step is to identify if the hair loss is scarring or non scarring. A history and physical examination is necessary as this will provide clues to the ultimate diagnosis. It is essential to ask about the onset, observed pattern, hairstyles, family history, diet, and social history.

Diffuse:

- Androgenetic alopecia: history of gradual thinning of hair and characteristic pattern. Males start to lose hair in the front and temples while females lose hair at the top of the head
- Diffuse alopecia areata: exclamation point hairs
- Alopecia totalis: concomitant loss of facial and skull hair
- Telogen effluvium: history of emotional or physiologic stress
- Anagen effluvium: history cancer treatments such as radiation and alkylating agents
- Dermatopathia pigmentosa reticularis: genetic autosomal dominant condition

Focal:

- Alopecia areata: smooth and round lesions
- Tinea capitis: black dots with broken hair strands, may see red, scaly lesions and swollen lymph nodes on the back of head.
- Traction alopecia: history of tight hairstyles and marginal hairline
- Trichotillomania: history of pulling hair or evidence of traumatic follicles

Pull Test

This test is performed to estimate the severity of hair loss and refine the differential diagnosis. A clinician grabs sections of hair and observes for active hair loss. A positive pull test is usually caused by telogen effluvium, androgenetic alopecia, and alopecia areata.

Tug Test

A doctor holds the top and bottom of a strand of hair and observes for a break in the middle which may be caused by a hair shaft abnormality.

Card Test

A part in the hair is created and a small card is placed to contrast the color of the hair and visualize thin strands of hair (seen in telogen effluvium) vs short broken strands (seen in hair shaft abnormalities).

Fungal Culture

Scalp is scraped and the specimen is incubated for fungal growth commonly seen in tinea capitis.

Scalp biopsy

If the diagnosis of hair loss is unclear or not responsive to the treatment, a scalp biopsy may be required. Scalp biopsy will show evidence of inflammation, location, and change in the follicles. This will frequently refine the diagnosis.

Blood Tests

In the case of suspected iron deficiency, thyroid disease, or androgen excess a blood test may be necessary to rule in these causes.

Trichoscopy

A new technique which allows for magnified visualization of the hair and scalp, providing a high definition, detailed look at follicles.

== Treatment ==
Steroids

Steroids may be used for the short-term treatment of autoimmune causes of hair loss such as alopecia areata. Topical or oral preparations may be used for a few weeks to reduce inflammation. Long term use of topical steroids has not shown benefits for growth and the use of long term oral steroids has many risks that typically outweigh the benefits.

Immunotherapy

Diphenylcyclopropenone or squaric acid may be used topically for the treatment of alopecia areata as an alternative to steroids. This treatment may cause a local skin reaction.

Minoxidil

Minoxidil is a topical treatment that comes in a solution or foam. The foam provides increased delivery of the drug and less irritation. This drug has been shown to decrease telogen and increase anagen phase of hair follicles, increase VEGF expression, and have indirect vasodilation effects. FDA has approved this drug for use in androgenetic alopecia, but frequent offlabel uses include alopecia areata, chemotherapy induced alopecia, telogen effluvium, and traction alopecia.

Redensyl

Redensyl is emerging as an alternative hair loss treatment containing a newly discovered molecule called dihydroquercetin-glucoside (DHQG), a compound derived from plant extracts known to target the stem cells in hair follicles and encourages the division of the cells. Redensyl has not been approved by the U.S. Food and Drug Administration (FDA). The only FDA-approved medications for treating androgenetic alopecia (AGA) are minoxidil and oral finasteride.

Hormone modulating

Androgenetic alopecia is routinely treated with drugs that alter hormonal function, in particular DHT's effects. Male pattern hair loss is treated with oral finasteride which is a 5-alpha reductase inhibitor that blocks the formation of DHT from testosterone. Finasteride may cause sexual dysfunction, but it is typically reversed upon discontinuation of the treatment. Female pattern hair loss is treated with spironolactone or flutamide that block the effects of DHT receptors.

Anti-fungal

Topical anti-fungal treatments such as ketoconazole and pyrithione zinc shampoo are sometimes effective for male pattern hair loss. Topical therapy is not usually effective for tinea capitis for which oral therapy with terbinafine, fluconazole, or griseofulvin is superior.

PRP

Patients may benefit from injections of plasma into the scalp to promote the delivery of nutrients in the plasma to the hair follicles. This has been shown to promote growth, blood supply, and collagen production.

Surgical

The two common surgical methods to treat hair loss are hair transplantation and scalp reduction. Hair transplantation involves the transfer of intact growing hair follicles from areas such as the back of the head to balding spots. This occurs in multiple visits as the number of transplanted follicles increased to restore a natural look. Scalp reduction is a technique that removes balding spots of skin and stretches the remaining skin that has normal hair growth. This is typically only possible in the back and top of the head and may cover up to half of the balding area.

== Prognosis ==
Treatment response to hair loss may be unpredictable and variable depending on the cause. 8.5% of patients with alopecia totalis may achieve complete recovery. Certain conditions such as tinea capitis and trichotillomania usually respond once the infection or hair pulling behaviors are stopped. Despite this many patients will achieve at least a temporary or partial recovery of hair loss.

== Complications ==
Patients with hair loss are at risk for psychological conditions such as increased anxiety and depression. Autoimmune causes of hair loss may put patients at risk for other autoimmune conditions such as hypothyroidism, hyperthyroidism, and vitiligo. Alopecia areata patients may develop insulin resistance putting them at a risk for type 2 diabetes.
