= Venkataram Mysore =

Indian dermatologist

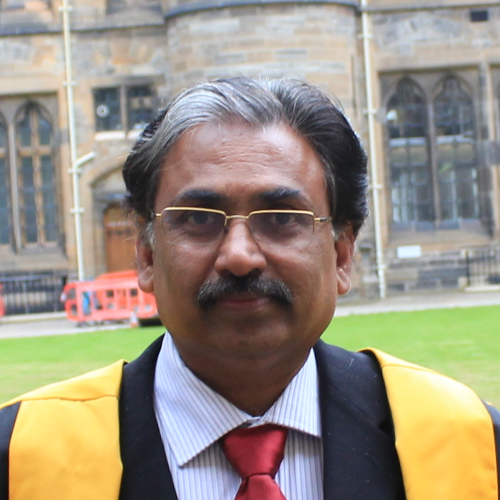
- Education: MBBS. DVD. DNB. M.D. DipRCPath (LOND), FRCP (Glasgow)
- Occupations: Dermatologist, Professor, Hair Transplant Surgeon
- Awards: ILDS Leadership Award; Lifetime Achievement Award by Dermazone South; The Ganapathi Panja award for Dermatology and dermatopathology ASDS International Leadership Award
- Website: https://www.venkatcenter.com

Venkataram Mysore is an Indian dermatologist, dermatopathologist, and hair transplant surgeon based in Bengaluru, India. He is the founder and director of the Venkat Centre for Skin and Plastic Surgery. Mysore has served as President of the Indian Association of Dermatologists, Venereologists and Leprologists (2015), the Association of Cutaneous Surgeons (India) (2010–2013), and the Association of Hair Restoration Surgeons of India (2013). He is the author of multiple dermatology textbooks and over 90 scientific publications, and serves on the editorial boards of the International Journal of Trichology and the Journal of Cutaneous and Aesthetic Surgery.

== Career ==
Venkataram Mysore is an Indian dermatologist, dermatopathologist, and hair transplant surgeon. He completed his MBBS from the University of Mysore in 1981, a Diploma in Dermatology (DVD) from the same university in 1985, a DNB from the National Board of Examinations in 1987, and an MD (Dermatology) in 1988. He was awarded the Diploma of the Royal College of Pathologists (DipRCPath, London) in 1995.

He served in the Indian Air Force from 1981 to 1986, before taking up overseas positions between 1990 and 2003, including consultant dermatologist roles at Al Nahdha Hospital, Oman (1990–1998) and Salmaniya Hospital, Bahrain (1998–2003). During this period, he was also on faculty at Sultan Qaboos University (Oman) and Arabian Gulf University (Bahrain).

Upon returning to India, he founded the Venkat Charmalaya – Centre for Advanced Dermatology and Post-graduate Training (later renamed the Venkat Centre for Skin and Plastic Surgery). The centre received accreditation from the Rajiv Gandhi University of Health Sciences (RGUHS) for postgraduate dermatology training in 2012.

He has held several leadership roles in dermatology and aesthetic surgery societies, including President of the Association of Cutaneous Surgeons (India) (2010–2013), President of the Association of Hair Restoration Surgeons of India (2013), and National President of the Indian Association of Dermatologists, Venereologists and Leprologists (IADVL) in 2015.

He has authored over 90 scientific publications, four books, and contributed chapters to several dermatology textbooks. He has received awards such as the ILDS Leadership Award and the ASDS International Leadership Award for his contributions to dermatologic surgery.

In 2025, he was listed among the top 2% of scientists globally in the field of dermatology according to the Stanford–Elsevier global database.

== Awards and recognitions ==
Venkataram Mysore has received several national and international awards for his contributions to dermatology and dermatologic surgery. These include:

- The International Leadership Award from the American Society for Dermatologic Surgery (ASDS) in 2013, recognizing his work in advancing dermatologic surgery and education.
- The Leadership Award from the International League of Dermatological Societies (ILDS) in 2017 for his global contributions to dermatology.
- The President’s Gold Medal from the Indian Association of Dermatologists, Venereologists and Leprologists (IADVL) for outstanding service to the speciality.
- The Lifetime Achievement Award from the Association of Hair Restoration Surgeons of India (AHRS) in 2022.

In 2025, he was listed among the top 2% of scientists globally in the field of dermatology according to the Stanford–Elsevier global database.

== Publications ==
Venkataram Mysore has authored and edited several books and over 90 peer-reviewed scientific papers in dermatology, dermatopathology, trichology, and aesthetic surgery.

His major books include:

- Dermatologic Surgery Made Easy (Jaypee Brothers Medical Publishers, 2013).
- Hair Transplantation (Jaypee Brothers Medical Publishers, 2009).
- Aesthetic Dermatology: Current Perspectives (Jaypee Brothers Medical Publishers, 2015).
- Manual of Dermatologic Surgery (Co-editor, with S. Sacchidanand and C. Ramesh, Jaypee Brothers, 2012).

He has also contributed textbook chapters on hair disorders, cutaneous surgery, and trichology in several international and Indian dermatology reference works. Mysore serves on the editorial boards of multiple dermatology journals, including the Journal of Cutaneous and Aesthetic Surgery and the International Journal of Trichology.

== See also ==
- Dermatology
- Hair transplantation
- Cutaneous surgery
- Trichology
