= Effluvium =

Effluvium may refer to:

- Telogen effluvium, the premature entry of hair into the telogen phase
- Anagen effluvium, the pathologic loss of hair in the anagen phase
