= Madarosis =

- Specialty: Dermatology, ophthalmology, optometry

Madarosis is a condition that results in the loss of eyelashes, and sometimes eyebrows. The term "madarosis" is derived from the ancient Greek "madaros", meaning "bald". Eyelashes are important in the prevention of bacteria and other foreign objects entering the eye. Some studies found that between 45 and 76 percent of patients with various types of leprosy had madarosis.

== Signs and symptoms ==
Madarosis is not a critical or severe condition. The main symptom and sign of madarosis is the loss of hair from the eyelids, eyebrows, or eyelashes. Many symptoms are from other diseases involved.

- Swollen, itchy, red, burning eyelids
- Loss of hair from other parts of the body, mainly the scalp
- Weight gain or palpitation if there is a thyroid problem

== Causes ==
There are various causes of madarosis.

- Ophthalmological conditions: blepharitis is an infection of the eyelid. Anterior blepharitis is either staphylococcal blepharitis, or seborrhoeic blepharitis and posterior blepharitis is due to the meibomian gland.
- Dermatologic conditions: there are multiple types of dermatological conditions that can result in madarosis. These include atopic dermatitis, seborrhoeic dermatitis atopic dermatitis, and psoriasis on the eyelids can result in madarosis. Others include: frontal fibrosing alopecia, ulerythema ophryogenes, acne rosacea, telogen effluvium, follicular mucinosis, and cutaneous sarcoidosis.
- Nutritional defects: Severe malnutrition can cause chronic hair loss. Hypoproteinemia causes hair loss by early onset of telogen. Zinc deficiencies like acrodermatitis enteropathica, can lead to the loss of eyebrow/eyelash hair. Other deficiencies like biotin and iron make it possible for loss of hair as well.
- Infections: There are many bodily infections that can cause the loss of eyelashes/eyebrows. The most common infection may be leprosy, such as lepromatous leprosy. Syphilis or other viral infections like herpes or HIV can cause the loss of eye hair as well. Fungal infections, like paracoccidioidomycosis, trichophyton, or microsporum, are also possible infection causes.
- Trauma: Most trauma injuries cause madarosis from the psychological standpoint, known as trichotillomania
- Drugs/Medications: Crack cocaine or chemotherapy drugs. Other drugs include:propranolol, valproic acid, barbiturates, MMR vaccine, botulinum toxin, epinephrine, antithyroid drugs, anticoagulants, and lipid-lowering drugs
- Genetics
- Autoimmune disorders: alopecia areata, discoid lupus erythematosus, chronic cutaneous lupus erythmatosus, Graham-Little syndrome, and Parry Romberg syndrome
- Other diseases: hypothyroidism, hyperthyroidism, hypoparathyroidism, hypopituitarism, amyloidosis, and Congenital erythropoietic Porphyria (Günther's disease)

== Pathophysiology ==
There are two major pathways. In the non-scarring pathway, the hair follicles remain intact which could potentially be reversed with the proper diagnosis and treatments. In the scarring pathway, the follicles are permanently lost due to tissue damage, atrophy, or inflammation.

The severity of the pre-existing condition determines which type of madarosis occurs.

- Ophthalmologic conditions: there are multiple types of infections and are common. The gray line of the eye is a line that divides the eyelid into parts: anterior part is skin and muscle while posterior is tarsus and conjunctiva. The blepharitis is classified based on the type of eyelid involvement. Anterior blepharitis is either staphylococcal blepharitis, or seborrhoeic blepharitis which have symptoms of the presence of scales that are along the hair shaft. Posterior blepharitis is usually due to meibomian gland dysfunction.
- Dermatologic conditions: there are multiple types of dermatological conditions that can result in madarosis dependent on the location. Atopic dermatitis is associated with allergic disorders and affects the lower eyelid. Seborrhoeic dermatitis can be seen as the scaling of the eyebrows. Loss of eyebrows is commonly seen from both atopic and seborrhoeic dermatitis due to continuous scratching/touching. Psoriasis on the eyelids can result in madarosis. Others include: frontal fibrosing alopecia, ulerythema ophryogenes, acne rosacea, telogen effluvium, follicular mucinosis, and cutaneous sarcoidosis.
- Nutritional Defects: Zinc is important in hair growth and the lack of zinc can cause hair loss, specifically madarosis. The main proteins in hair are biotin and iron (ferritin) so deficiencies would result in a loss of hair.
- Infections: Unilateral madarosis (only one eye) may occur in tuberculoid leprosy from granulomatous infiltration of hair follicles ultimately destroying them. Infections like syphilis by causing a moth-eaten appearance of the eyebrow hair loss. Viral infections like herpes or HIV can cause scarring of the eyelid, causing loss of hair. Various fungal infections like paracoccidioidomycosis can cause lesions and changes in the hair locations of the eyelid.
- Trauma: Trichotillomania is a psychological disorder where the hair is pulled out or breakage occurs when anxious. Both trichoteiromania (hair loss from constant rubbing) and trichotemnomania (hair loss from constant shaving of the hair) can result in hair loss.
- Drugs/Medications: The heart medication amiodarone has been reported to commonly cause loss of eyelashes and eyebrows. Cocaine abuse has shown hair loss due to the hot vapors traveling up causing burning of the hair of the eyebrows or eyelashes. Radiotherapy and chemotherapy can cause hair loss due to the eradication of the hair cells, especially when used to treat ocular tumors.
- Genetics: Some of the diseases listed in the causes can be inherited.

== Diagnosis ==
The main diagnosis technique is observing the area. Then blood tests can be done to determine if there is a pre-existing condition. Family history can be considered because some of the related causes/conditions can be inherited.

=== Classifications ===
There are two major types of classifications of madarosis. The first is labeled as "non-scarring." Non-scarring the hair has the ability to regrowth after treatment of the primary disorder. Scarring madarosis is when the hair loss is permanent and can only regrow after cosmetic treatments.

== Prevention ==
The only prevention method is determining the underlying condition before treatment options are too late.

== Treatments ==
Madarosis has different possible treatments and can be reversed if treated early enough. The treatments for madarosis are completely dependent upon the pre-existing condition. When treating blepharitis, antibiotics are used to combat the bacterial infection. People with trichotillomania need to seek behavioral and psychological help. Many people look to hair transplant surgeries, especially in non-scarring cases. These surgeries are mainly used as a cosmetic reason rather than a medical one. There are also other treatments that can be used for cosmetic purposes.

=== Surgical treatments ===
There are restoration surgeries for the eyebrows in severe cases. Many surgeons opt for nylon implants, but have been banned in some countries due to infections. Follicular transplantation is now the procedure of choice. In this surgery, hair samples are individually taken for a donor area and transplanted into the thinning area. Small incisions are made and grafts are placed individually according to the amount of hair in each follicle, eyebrows single. In this procedure, there are no scars or stitches and hair begins to grow after a few months post surgery.

=== Medications ===
Minoxidil is a common topical treatment of eyebrow hair loss due to alopecia areata. There are other topical treatments (latanprost or bimatroprost) that are mainly used to treat glaucoma that can also be used to lengthen, thicken, and change the pigments of the lashes.

=== Cosmetic treatments ===
Many people use cosmetic treatments to cover the loss of the hair, such as applying artificial eyelashes, tattooing eyebrows/eyelashes, penciling in the eyebrows or using mascara to make the existing eyelashes look longer. Some people even use eyeliner to make the eye stand out when lacking eyelashes.

== Recent research ==
There is currently researching being done to find more treatments dependent on the different pre-existing conditions.

Studies are being conducted in which madarosis can be related to malignancy. A study by Groehler and Rose found that there was a statistical significance between these two. They concluded that patients malignancy lesions on the eyelid have a higher chance of having madarosis than a patient with a benign lesion. They stated that despite the fact that it is significant, the absence of madarosis does not mean the lesion cannot be malignant.

In many leprosy cases, madarosis is a symptom or a quality after diagnosis. However, in India, leprosy is common and researchers report a case of madarosis before diagnosis of leprosy with no skin lesions, only madarosis. This allowed for quicker treatment.

The main reason many people have madarosis is due to the chemotherapy drugs. There was a clinical trial in 2011 that tested an eyelash gel called bimatoprost. This gel enhanced the eyelashes in quantity and thickness. They tested this on 20 breast cancer patients who were undergoing chemotherapy. Results seemed positive, in that the group of people who used the gel had growth of eyelashes after the chemotherapy drugs.

== See also ==
- Sign of Hertoghe
