= C11H13NO4 =

The molecular formula C_{11}H_{13}NO_{4} (molar mass: 223.23 g/mol, exact mass: 223.0845 u) may refer to:

- N-Acetyl-L-tyrosine
- Bendiocarb
- Diethyl lutidinate
- Mephenoxalone
