= Toupée =

Hairpiece or partial wig of natural or synthetic hair

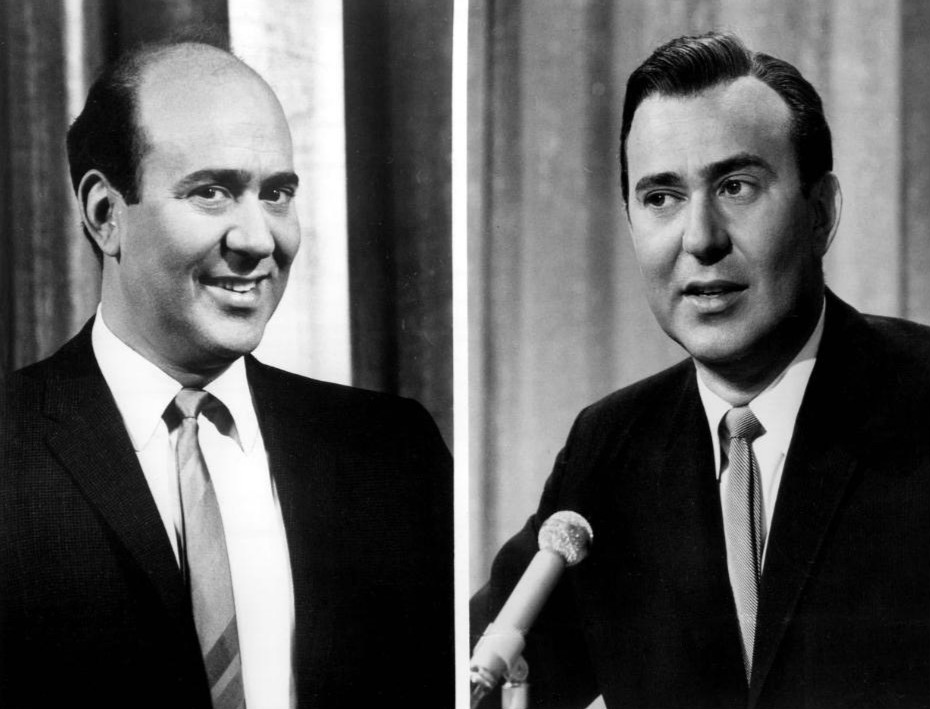
Actor Carl Reiner without (left) and with (right) a toupée

A toupée (/tuːˈpeɪ/ too-PAY) is a hairpiece or partial wig of natural or synthetic hair worn to cover partial baldness or for theatrical purposes. While toupées and hairpieces are typically associated with male wearers, some women also use hairpieces to lengthen existing hair, or cover a partially exposed scalp.

== Etymology ==
Toupée comes from the French toupet, meaning tuft of hair, as in a curl or lock of hair at the top of the head, not necessarily relating to covering baldness.

== History ==
=== 18th century ===
The toupée developed during the 18th century. Their popularity began to fade after the French Revolution.

=== 19th century ===
In the United States, toupée use (as opposed to wigs) grew in the 19th century. One researcher has noted that this is in part due to a shift in perceptions over the perceived value of aging that occurred at that time. Men chose to attempt to appear younger, and toupées were one method used.

...since 1800, the U.S. Census generally shows far more 39-year-olds than 40-year-olds. Furthermore, the costume of men switched from a design clearly intended to make the young look older to one that was clearly intended to make the old look younger. For example, this era saw the decline of the wig and the rise of the toupée.

=== 20th century ===
By the 1950s, it was estimated that over 350,000 U.S. men wore hairpieces, out of a potential 15 million wearers. Toupée manufacturers helped to build credibility for their product starting in 1954, when several makers advertised hairpieces in major magazines and newspapers, with successful results. Key to the promotion and acceptance of toupées was improved toupée craftsmanship, pioneered by Max Factor. Factor's toupées were carefully made and almost invisible, with each strand of hair sewed to a piece of fine flesh-colored lace, and in a variety of long and short hairstyles. Factor, also a Hollywood makeup innovator, was the supplier of choice for most Hollywood actors.

By 1959, total U.S. sales were estimated by Time magazine to be $15 million a year. Sears-Roebuck, which had sold toupées as early as 1900 via its mail order catalog, tried to tap into the market by sending out 30,000 special catalogs by direct mail to a targeted list, advertising "career winning" hair products manufactured by Joseph Fleischer & Co., a respected wig manufacturer. Toupées continued to be advertised in print, likely with heavier media buys taking place in magazines with the appropriate male demographic.

By 1970, Time magazine estimated that in the U.S., toupées were worn by more than 2.5 million men out of 17–20 million balding men. The increase was chalked up once again to further improvements in hairpiece technology, a desire to seem more youthful, and the long hairstyles that were increasingly in fashion.

=== 21st century ===
Toupée and wig manufacture is no longer centered in the U.S., but in Asia. Aderans, based in Japan, is one of the world's largest wigmakers, with 35% share of the Japanese domestic market.

From 2002 to 2004, new orders from Aderans's male customers (both domestic and international) slipped by 30%. Researchers at both the Daiwa Institute and Nomura Research – two key Japanese economic research institutes – conclude that there is "no sign of a recovery" for the toupée industry. Sales for male wearers have continued to fall at Aderans in every year since, aside from 2016 where they increased slightly.

These numbers confirm the media consensus that toupée use is in decline overall.

== Manufacture ==
Toupées are often custom made to the needs of the wearer, and can be manufactured using either synthetic or human hair. Toupées are usually held to one's head using an adhesive, but the cheaper versions often merely use an elastic band.

Toupée manufacture is often done at the local level by a craftsman, but large wig manufacturers also produce toupées. Both individuals and large firms have constantly innovated to produce better quality toupées and toupée material, with over 60 patents for toupées. and over 260 for hairpieces filed at the U.S. Patent Office since 1790.

The first patent for a toupée was filed in 1921, and the first patent for a "hairpiece" was filed in 1956.

=== Hair weaves ===
Hair weaves are a technique in which the toupée's base is then woven into whatever natural hair the wearer retains. While this may result in a less detectable toupée, the wearer can experience discomfort, and sometimes hair loss from frequently retightening of the weave as one's own hair grows. After about six months a person can begin to lose hair permanently along the weave area, resulting in traction alopecia. Hair weaves were very popular in the 1980s and 1990s, but are not usually recommended because of the potential for permanent hair damage and hair loss.

== Use and maintenance ==
While toupée dealers and manufacturers usually advertise their products showing men swimming, water-skiing and enjoying watersports, these activities can often cause irreversible wear to the toupée. Saltwater and chlorine can cause a toupée to "wear out" quickly. Many shampoos and soaps will damage toupée fibers, which unlike natural hair, cannot grow back or replace themselves.

While the presence of toupées can be made virtually undetectable, the hairpieces must be very high quality, carefully fitted, and maintained regularly and carefully. Toupées typically need to be replaced on a regular basis, due to wear and, over time, to the growing areas of baldness on the wearer's head and changes in the shade of remaining hair.

Toupée wearers may choose to own two or even three toupées at a time, ensuring that they have one to wear while the other is being cleaned, and, optionally, a spare.

== Alternatives ==
Men typically wear toupées after resorting to less extreme methods of coverage. The first tactic is to make remaining hair appear thick and widespread through a combover. Other alternatives include non-surgical hair replacement, which consists of a very thin hairpiece which is put on with a medical adhesive and worn for weeks at a time.

=== Medications and medical procedures ===
Propecia, Rogaine and other pharmaceutical remedies were approved for treatment of alopecia by the U.S. Food and Drug Administration in the 1990s. These have proven capable of regrowing or sustaining existing hair at least part of the time.

However, hair transplantation, which guarantees at least some immediate results, has often replaced the use of toupées among those who can afford them, particularly onscreen celebrities.

=== Baldness as fashion, acceptance of hair loss ===
Other trends leading to the decline in toupée use include a rise in acceptance of baldness by those men experiencing it. Short haircuts, in fashion since the 1990s, have tended to minimize the appearance of baldness, and many balding men choose to shave their heads entirely.

== Humor ==
Toupées have a long and often humorous history in Western culture. The toupée is a regular butt of jokes in many media, with a typical toupée joke focusing on the wearer's inability to recognize how ineffective the toupée is in concealing their baldness. An early instance of "toupée humor" was an illustration by George Cruikshank in "The Comic Almanack" in 1837, in which he drew the effect of a strong wind, with a man's toupée whipped from his head.

In the 20th century, toupées were a source of humor in virtually all forms of media, including cartoons, films, radio and television. In the 21st century, toupées continue to be a source for humor, with a variety of internet sites devoted to toupées, with a special emphasis on suspected celebrity hairpiece wearers. Also, toupée is a homophone of "to pay" and has been used in many jokes.

Thaddeus Stevens, famed 19th-century U.S. Congressman and abolitionist, was known for his humor and wit. On one occasion while in the Capitol, a woman requested a lock of his hair (collecting locks of hair was common at this time). Since he was bald and wearing a toupée, he ripped it off and gave it to her.

== Known wearers ==
- Bud Abbott (Note: wore a front toupée in early films)
- Steve Allen
- Fred Astaire (Note: he appeared sans toupée while entertaining the troops overseas)
- Edgar Bergen
- Humphrey Bogart
- George Burns
- Archie Campbell (Note: this Hee Haw comedian was said to be so sensitive about his balding head that he would not let visitors see him in the hospital because he could not put on his toupée.)
- Gary Cooper (Note: he was not totally bald but used a "thickening" toupée in later years, which was on display at the Max Factor Museum in Hollywood)
- Howard Cosell
- Bing Crosby (Note: chose not to wear a toupée during WWII USO Tours)
- Peter Cushing (Note: often wore a toupée in films in later years, but equally often appeared without it, letting the character he was playing dictate the hair style.)
- Bobby Darin
- Bruce Forsyth
- Paul Harvey
- Frankie Howerd (Note: toupée later sold at auction)
- Gene Kelly (Note: when not on camera, he wore caps or trilby hats)
- Jack Klugman (Note: he wore one during his time on The Odd Couple and Quincy, M.E., but his appearances on Match Game during the same time, he did not wear one.)
- Fred MacMurray
- Miles Malleson
- Groucho Marx (Note: he wore one for his television quiz show You Bet Your Life, but during the same period would sometimes appear on talk shows without it.)
- John L. Mica
- Charles Nelson Reilly (Note: it was a long-standing joke on Match Game in the 1970s. During the airing of one broadcast, he actually took off his toupée and loaned it to a bald guest.)
- Carl Reiner (Note: the comic actor would regularly appear with or without the toupée, depending on the requirements of the role.)
- Rob Reiner (Note: Reiner started wearing a hairpiece during the second season of All in the Family to hide his premature hair loss, as he was playing a character who was in his early 20s.)
- John D. Rockefeller (Note: Rockefeller only started wearing them after 1901 when his alopecia caused him to lose his natural hair and mustache)
- William Roth
- William Shatner
- Frank Sinatra
- James Stewart
- Rip Taylor
- James Traficant
- Billy Vaughn
- John Wayne
