= Desmond Tobin =

Irish academic, researcher and author

Desmond John Tobin
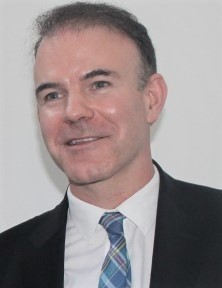
- Occupations: Academic, researcher and author
- Relatives: Peadar Tóibín (brother)

Academic background
- Education: Maynooth University; North East Surrey College of Technology; King's College London
- Thesis: Structural and functional studies of normal hair growth and changes in alopecia areata (1991)

Desmond John Tobin is an Irish academic, researcher and author. He is a full professor of dermatological science at University College Dublin and the director of the Charles Institute of Dermatology. He was chair of British Society for Investigative Dermatology from 2018 to 2020. Tobin is a fellow of The Royal College of Pathologists, of the Higher Education Academy, of the Royal Society of Biology, Institute of Biomedical Science, and of the Institute of Trichologists (where he is currently vice-president).

Tobin's research is focused on pigmentation and hair follicle health. He has conducted extensive research on Alopecia areata, where he was the first researcher to show that patients with AA have circulating antibodies to hair follicle-specific antigens, including trichohyalin. He is also a regional editor for the International Journal of Trichology.

== Education ==
A native of Navan, County Meath, Ireland, Tobin completed high school education at St Patrick’s Classical School, Navan, and was awarded a B.Sc. from Maynooth University in 1986.

Tobin then joined North East Surrey College of Technology where he completed his G.I. in Biology (immunology) in 1987. In 1991, he received his Ph.D. from St John's Institute of Dermatology at King's College London. Subsequently he moved to the United States, where he completed his research post-doctoral training at the Dept. of Dermatology NYU, New York.

== Career ==
Tobin briefly worked as Assistant Research Professor at the Department of Dermatology, New York University and Adjunct Assistant Professor at City University of New York before moving back to the Europe in 1996. There he joined University of Bradford as a lecturer in Biomedical Sciences. He moved up in the ranks becoming a Full Professor in 2004. From 2005 to 2008, he served as the director of the Medical Biosciences Research Group. In 2008, he was appointed the Associate Dean for Research and Knowledge Transfer at the Faculty of Life Sciences.

Tobin founded the Center for Skin Sciences at University of Bradford in 2009 and served as its director until 2018. In 2018, he left University of Bradford to return home to Ireland to join the University College Dublin, where he was appointed the director of Charles Institute of Dermatology.

In 2018, Tobin was appointed the chair of British Society for Investigative Dermatology. In May 2021, he was made a member of the Royal Irish Academy.

== Research and work ==
=== Pigmentation & neuroendocrine research ===
Tobin’s lab developed an assay for tracking melanin transfer events, followed by a study on a key motor protein to drive melanin transfer between melanocytes and keratinocytes in human skin. These latter findings were translated in product development for pigmentation spots and potentially also melasma. Via university-owned IP, his team discovered a potential new ‘sun-less tanning’ small peptide technology.

Tobin identified the basis for the clinically-observed preferential targeting of pigmented hair (and relative sparing of white hair) in Alopecia areata (AA), with his data showing that pigmented hair follicle melanocytes are destroyed in acute AA. This also explains rapid so-called ‘going white overnight’. Tobin's laboratory was the first to report that the opioid b-endorphin acts a surprising and potent pigmentary molecule.

Tobin’s work is also interested in the life and death of pigment cells; key not only for those with age-related loss of hair pigmentation, but also for those with malignant pigment cells. He reported the first recognized spontaneous and cyclical programmed cell death in the melanocyte system in humans, during the regression phase of the hair growth cycle. This may be harnessed in apoptosis-resistant melanoma. With vitiligo, he and his colleagues challenged the prevailing view that all melanocytes were lost/destroyed in epidermis of patients with this skin-depigmenting disorder. He proposed that these cells survived best if un/dedifferentiated, opening up possibilities of treating even fully-white vitiligo skin of long duration.

=== Hair follicle in health & disease ===
Tobin with others has assessed the genetics of hair traits, and revealed several novel genes including the first gene associated with gray hair, in addition to other hair traits like mono-brow, beard density, and straight vs curly hair. He has also advanced the understanding of how oxidative stress can weaken the melanocyte system of both the skin and aging hair follicle, and how this may be stabilized via anti-oxidant protection.

Tobin has conducted extensive research on Alopecia areata (AA). He was the first to show that patients with AA have circulating antibodies to hair follicle-specific antigens, including trichohyalin.

== Awards and honors ==
- 1999 - Fellowship of The Institute of Trichologists (Elected Vice-President 2008)
- 2008 - Fellowship of The Royal College of Pathologists
- 2008 - Fellowship of The Royal Society of Biology
- 2011 - Winner of top award in hair science research awarded by European Hair Research Society (John F Ebling Lectureship)
- 2012 - Winner of a top award in pigmentation sciences awarded by Asian Society for Pigmentation Research (John Pawelek Lecturership)
- 2017 - Fellowship of the Institute of Biomedical Science
- 2021 - Elected Member of the Royal Irish Academy

== Publications ==
=== Books ===
- Hair in Toxicology; An Important Bio-monitor (2005)
- Hair Loss Disorders in Domestic Animals (2009)
- Aging Hair (2010)

=== Selected articles ===
- Tobin DJ, Swanson NN, Pittelkow MR, Peters EMJ, Schallreuter KU (2000): Melanocytes are not absent in lesional skin of long duration vitiligo. Journal of Pathology 191:407-16
- Mecklenburg L, Tobin DJ, Muller-Rover S, Handjiski B, Wendt G, Peters EMJ, Pohl S, Moll I, Paus R (2000): Active hair growth (anagen) is associated with angiogenesis. Journal of Investigative Dermatology 114:909-16
- Tobin DJ, Paus R (2001): Graying: gerontobiology of the hair follicle pigmentary unit. Experimental Gerontology 36: 1;29-54
- Slominski A, Pisarchik A, Semak I, Sweatman T, Wortsman J, Szczesniewski A, Slugocki G, McNulty J, Kauser S, Tobin DJ, Jing C, Johansson O (2002): Human skin fully expresses intrinsic serotoninergic and melatoninergic systems. FASEB J 16:8:896-98
- J, Gläser K, Roth W, Tobin DJ, Petermann I, Matthias R, Mönnig G, Haverkamp W, Breithardt G, Schmahl W, Peters C, Reinheckel T (2002): Dilated cardiomyopathy in mice deficient for the lysosomal cysteine peptidase cathepsin L. Proceedings of the National Academy of Sciences USA 99(9): 6234-39
- Slominski A, Tobin DJ, Shibahara S, Wortsman J (2004): Melanin pigmentation in mammalian skin and its hormonal regulation. Physiological Reviews 84: 1155-228
- Slominski A, Wortsman, Plonka PM, Schallreuter KU, Paus R, Tobin DJ (2005): Hair follicle pigmentation. Journal of Investigative Dermatology 124(1):13-21
- Böhm M, Luger T, Tobin DJ, García-Borrón JC (2006): Melanocortin receptor ligands: new horizons for skin biology and clinical dermatology. Journal of Investigative Dermatology, 126:1966-75
- Tobin DJ (2006): Biochemistry of human skin - Our Brain on the Outside. Chemical Society Reviews. 35(1):52-67
- Slominski A, Zbytek B, Zmijewski M, Slominski R, Kauser S, Wortsman J, Tobin DJ (2006): Corticotropin releasing hormone in the skin. Frontiers in Bioscience 11; 2230–48
