= Traction alopecia =

Type of hair loss

Traction alopecia is a type of alopecia or hair loss caused by a chronic pulling force being applied to the hair. It commonly results from a person frequently wearing their hair in tight styles, such as a ponytail, pigtails, or braids. This has an increased likelihood when the hair is chemically relaxed as this compromises the hair shaft's tensile strength, resulting in more hair breakage. Traction alopecia causes a recession of the hairline due to chronic traction, which is characterized by a fringe along the marginal hairline on physical exam. Diagnosis is clinical and treatment directed at cessation of the chronic traction, while cosmeses, with surgical restoration is reserved for severe cases with scarring fibrosis.

== Cause ==
=== Traumatic hairstyle ===
It is commonly seen with certain hair styles like particularly tight ponytails, pigtails, braids, or a braiding pattern that pulls the hairline forcefully towards the vertex of the scalp. Traction alopecia has been reported more often in African-American women (as some wear their hair tightly pulled back). Sometimes, this tension can cause scarring. It has also been seen in female ballerinas, and seen occasionally in long-haired people who use barrettes to keep hair out of their faces and in cultural traditions where the hair is voluntarily not cut in religious obeisance, the latter caused by progressively increasing weight of the hair itself. Traction alopecia is mechanical in cause, rather than androgenic. Traction alopecia is a substantial risk in hair weaves, which can be worn either to conceal hair loss, or purely for cosmetic purposes. The former involves creating a braid around the head below the existing hairline, to which an extended-wear hairpiece, or wig, is attached. Since the hair of the braid is still growing, it requires frequent maintenance, which involves the hairpiece being removed, the natural hair braided again, and the piece snugly reattached. The tight braiding and snug hairpiece cause tension on the hair that is already at risk for falling out. Dreadlocks and single (extension) braids can have the same effect. Men and women who have had traction alopecia have found that the hair loss occurs most at the hair line—primarily around the temples and the sides of their heads. Traction alopecia is one of the most common causes of hair loss in African American women.

Tight or heavy hairstyles, such as long box braids, can also cause an external-traction headache, previously called a ponytail headache.

=== Headgear ===
- Nurses who wear caps which are tightly secured by pins at the side or back of the head can develop traction alopecia.
- Sikh men and women are susceptible to traction alopecia if the hair under the turban is tied too tightly for many years.
- The way in which a hijab is worn and the hairstyle used underneath may also contribute to hair loss.
- Compressive safety helmets worn tightly and closely to the scalp are a cause of traction alopecia. The lining of tightly fitted safety helmets like those worn for activities such as motorcycling, cycling, skiing and snowboarding are responsible for the constant rubbing and tugging of localised areas of the hair and scalp. Frequent wearers or those who use such helmets for prolonged periods seem more likely to develop traction alopecia.

=== Chemicals ===
A condition known as CCCA (central cicatricial centrifugal alopecia), seen almost exclusively in African American women, can cause extensive hair loss. It is caused by a combination of too much stress (traction) on the hair and the use of harsh relaxers and dyes.

== Diagnosis ==
Traction alopecia is characterized by a fringe along the marginal hairline on physical exam, a recession of the hairline due to chronic traction.

Differential diagnosis of this type of patchy alopecia when it is in the non scarring stage includes trichotillomania and alopecia areata, in the late stage, when smooth hairless patches are present with follicular drop out, it can resemble scarring alopecias such as frontal fibrosing alopecia (FFA) and patchy central centrifugal cicatricial alopecia (CCCA).

Frontal fibrosing alopecia can present with an unusual retention of the hairline (pseudo-fringe sign).

== Treatment ==
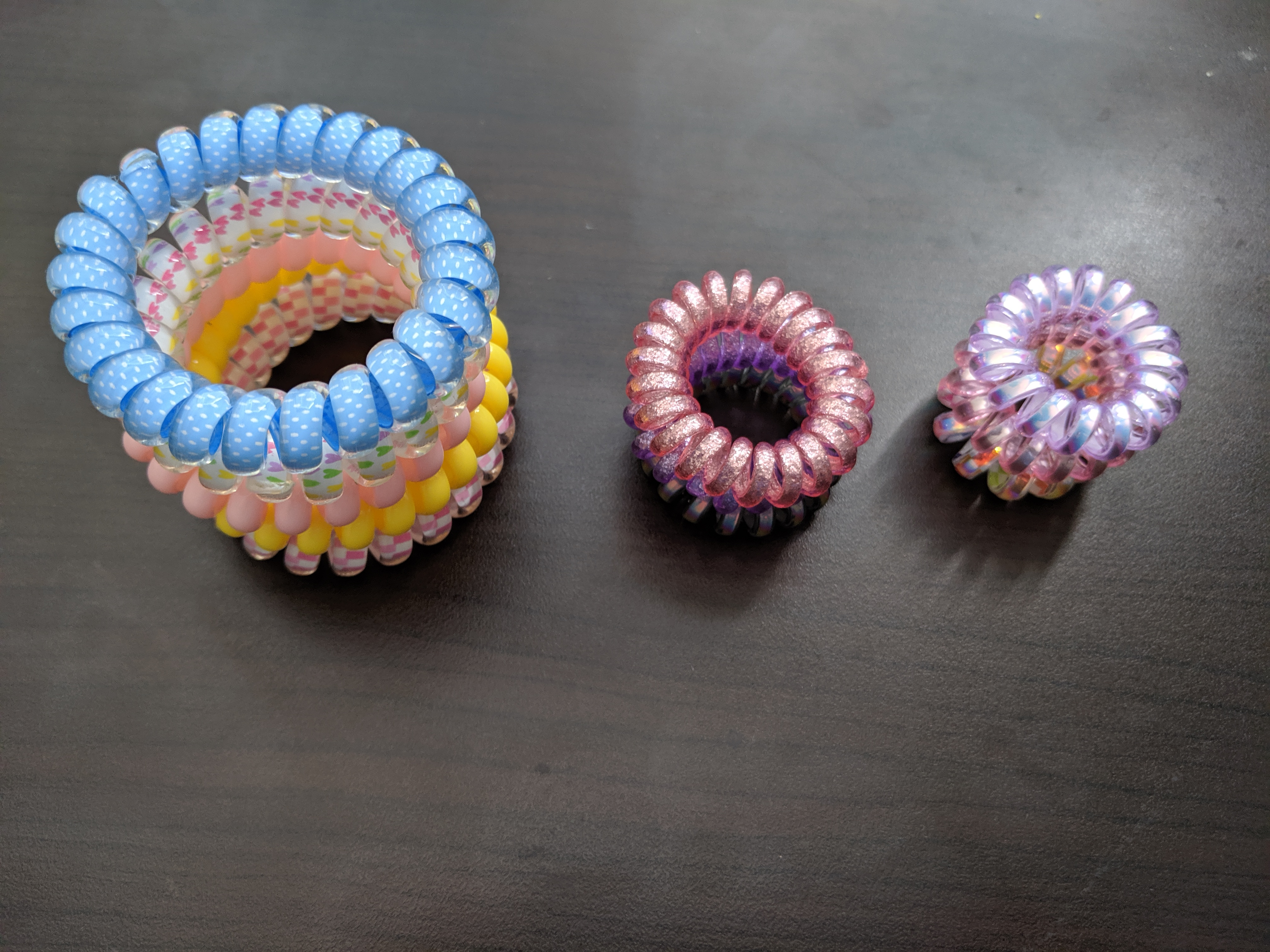
Spiral hair ties are marketed as reduced traction.

Treatment is typically not pharmaceutical. Management includes cessation of the chronic traction, cosmeses, with surgical restoration reserved for more severe cases with scarring fibrosis.

== See also ==
- Croydon facelift
- Cicatricial alopecia
- List of cutaneous conditions
