= Philip Kingsley =

British trichologist and hair-care specialist (1930–2016)

- Born: 4 June 1930; London, England
- Died: 4 September 2016 (aged 86); London, England
- Occupations: Trichologist, author and entrepreneur
- Spouse: Joan Maizner
- Children: 4
- Website: philipkingsley.co.uk

Philip Kingsley (4 June 1930 – 4 September 2016) was a British trichologist, author and hair-care specialist.

== Early life ==
Kingsley was born in Bethnal Green, London to Barney Kingsley, a tailor, and Dora (née Silver), a seamstress. He left school at 14 to apprentice in his uncle's hairdressing salon to help support his family. He studied scalp dermatology and hair cycles by correspondence with the Institute of Trichologists and qualified in 1953.

== Career ==
Kingsley opened his first clinic in London in 1957 and later established permanent premises in Mayfair. In 1977 he expanded to Fifth Avenue, New York City. Kingsley's clients included numerous prominent figures such as Audrey Hepburn, Laurence Olivier, Jane Fonda, Gwyneth Paltrow, Cate Blanchett, Sienna Miller, Ivana Trump, Mick Jagger and British royalty. He built a retail product line, formalising products in 1983 and remaining involved in their testing and production thereafter.

Kingsley developed Elasticizer, a pre-shampoo hair masque originally created for Audrey Hepburn during the making of the film Robin and Marian. In 1984 he introduced the Swimcap conditioning treatment for use by the United States Olympic synchronized swimming team. Kingsley authored four books on hair care, including The Hair Bible (2003), and wrote advice columns for The Sunday Times magazine. In addition he apparently coined the phrase “bad hair day”.

== Later life and death ==
He continued to oversee his business until his death at home in London on 4 September 2016. The cause of death was a stroke. Kingsley was survived by his second wife, Joan Maizner, two daughters from that marriage and two daughters from an earlier marriage.
