= Sign of Hertoghe =

Medical sign involving partial eyebrow loss

- Other names: Queen Anne's sign
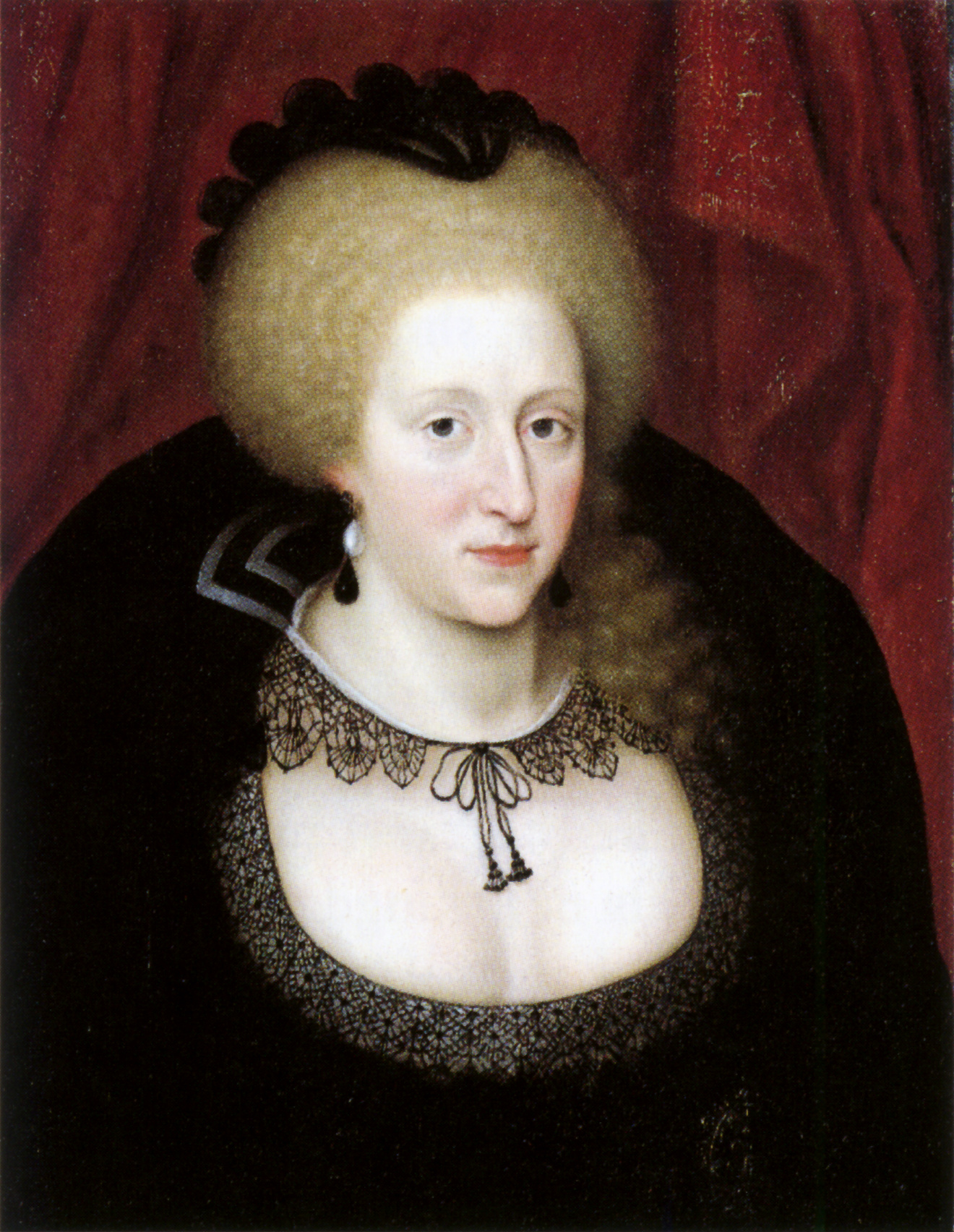
- Anne of Denmark mourning the death of her son Henry in 1612
- Causes: Hypothyroidism, atopic dermatitis
- Named after: Eugene Ludovic Christian Hertoghe

The sign of Hertoghe or Queen Anne's sign is a type of madarosis, more specifically a thinning or loss of the outer third of the eyebrows, and may appear in severe hypothyroidism or atopic dermatitis. It was also observed in lepromatous leprosy, secondary syphilis, hypoparathyroidism, poisoning with either lead or thallium, lupus, or normal aging.

== Name ==
The sign is named after the Belgian internist Eugene Ludovic Christian Hertoghe (April 5, 1860–January 3, 1928), who was a native of Antwerp, and was the first pioneer in thyroid function research.

=== Queen Anne's sign ===
The association with Anne of Denmark is based on portraiture, although history does not suggest that she suffered an underactive thyroid. The eponym is disputed by some, though it has been suggested that Anne of France, Anne of Brittany, Anne of Austria, Anne Boleyn, and Anne of Cleves may all be eliminated as candidates.
