= Croydon facelift =

Type of hairstyle

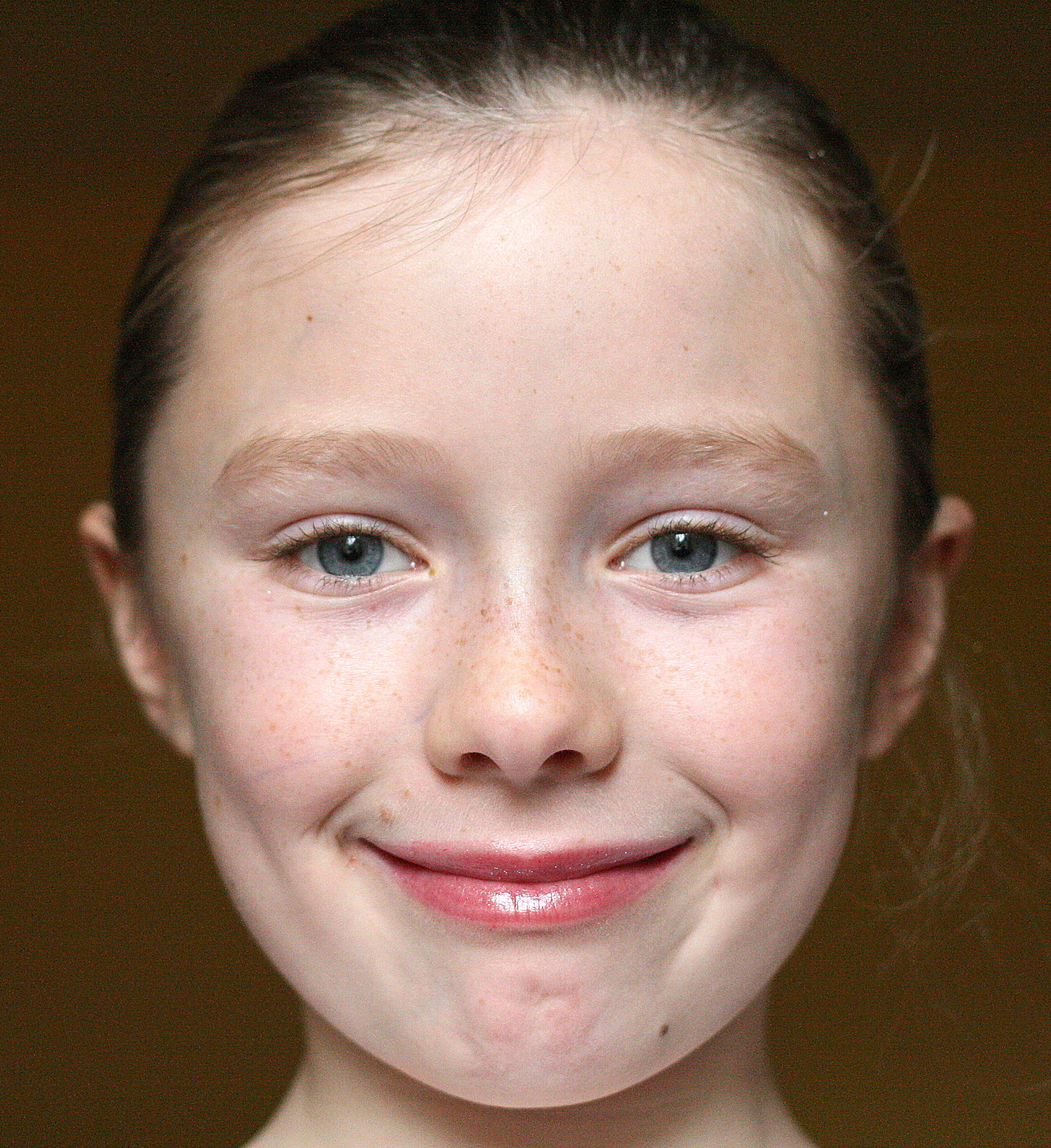
Croydon facelift

In English slang, a Croydon facelift (sometimes council house facelift, or in Northern Ireland a Millie facelift) is a particular hairstyle worn by some women. The hair is pulled back tightly and tied in a bun or ponytail at the back. The supposed result is that the skin of the forehead and face are pulled up and back, producing the effects of a facelift.

Traction alopecia, a type of gradual hair loss, can result from hairstyles that tightly pull the hair in this manner.

This hairstyle is frequently portrayed in the media as belonging to young women from the lower social classes, particularly the Chav subculture (Ned in Scotland, Millie in Northern Ireland). The term is thus considered derogatory because it portrays people from Croydon as being lower class. Croydon can be replaced by the name of any other unfashionable residential area.

The Croydon Guardian newspaper jokingly suggested that the style may have originated with the ancient Egyptian Queen Nefertiti.

== See also ==
- JoJo Siwa
- List of hairstyles
