= Comb over =

Hairstyle

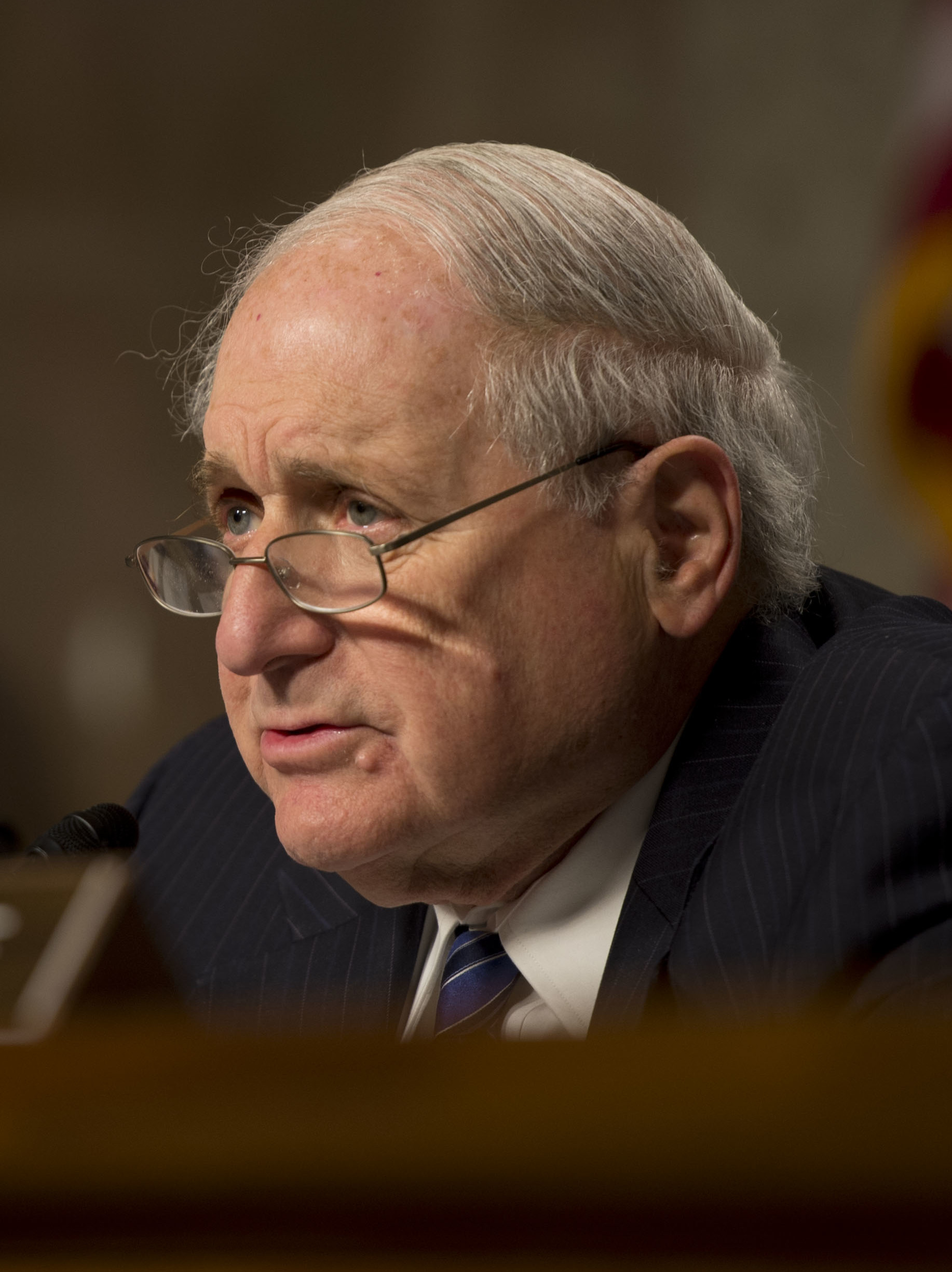
Carl Levin, former US Senator for Michigan, sporting a combover

A comb over or combover is a hairstyle for bald or balding men in which the hair is grown long and combed over the short hair area to minimize the appearance of the scalp. Sometimes the parting is lowered so that more hair can be used to cover the head.

== Patent ==
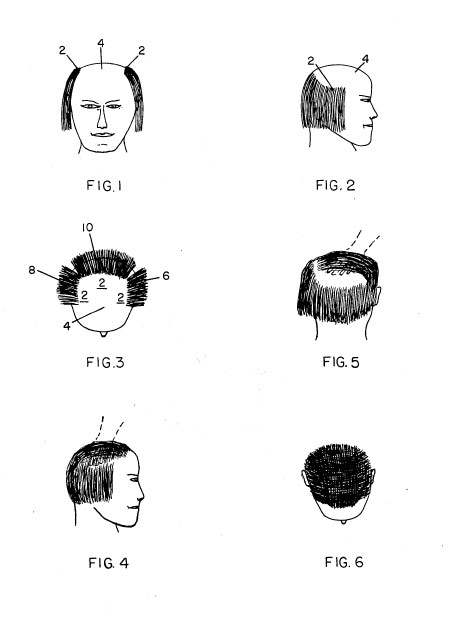
Patent by Donald and Frank Smith, 1977

On 10 May 1977, Donald J. Smith and his father, Frank J. Smith, of Orlando, Florida, were awarded a patent (U.S. patent 4,022,227) for their variation of the comb over that conceals baldness by combing long hair in three separate directions.

== See also ==
- List of hairstyles
- Pattern hair loss § Society and culture
