= Frontal fibrosing alopecia =

- Other names: FFA
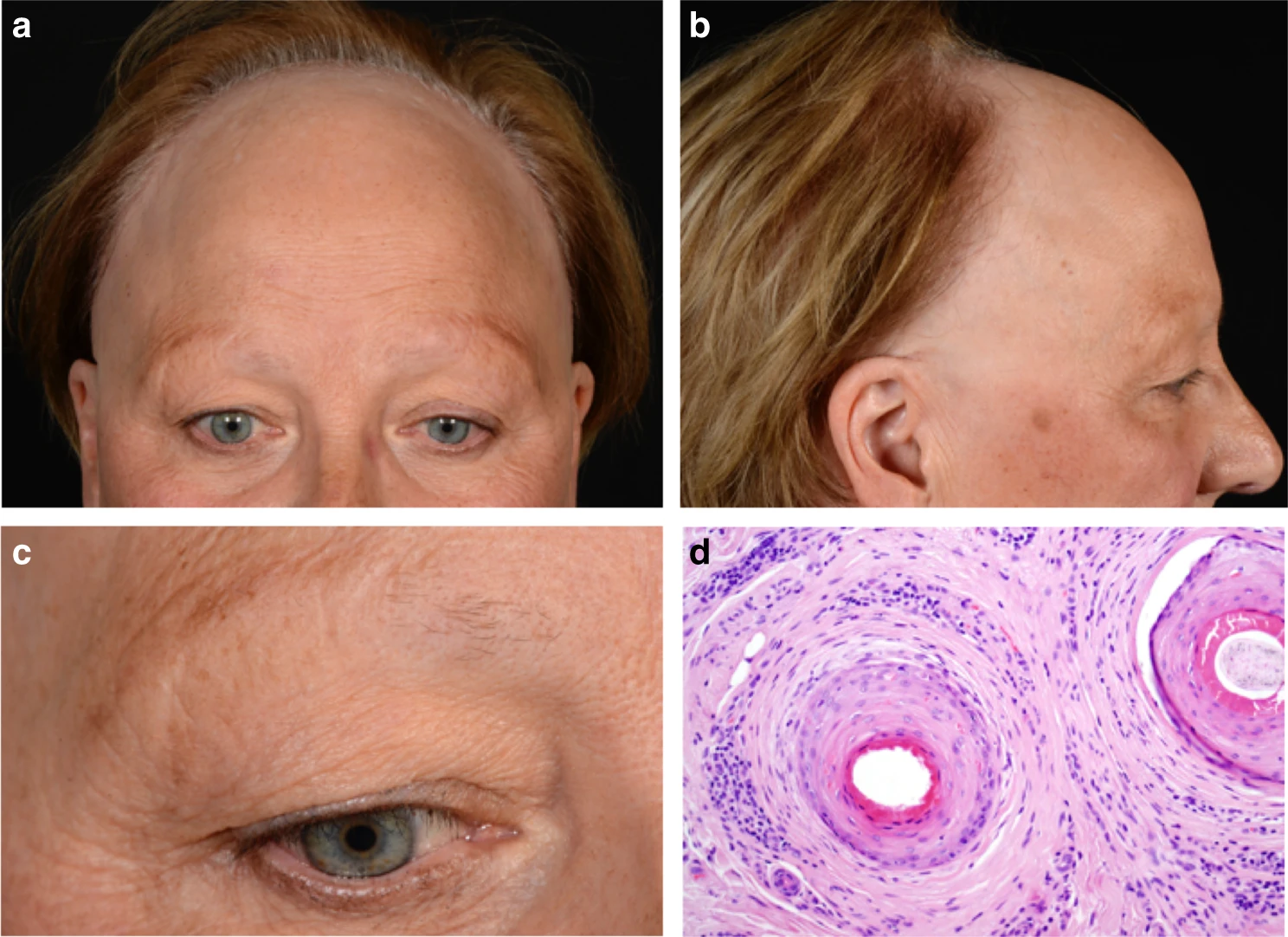
- Specialty: Dermatology

Frontal fibrosing alopecia is the frontotemporal hairline recession and eyebrow loss in postmenopausal women that is associated with perifollicular erythema, especially along the hairline. It is considered to be a clinical variant of lichen planopilaris.

== Presentation ==
There is loss of both terminal and vellus hairs that occurs in a bandlike pattern on the frontotemporal scalp. It is a scarring alopecia that has been associated with facial papules, glabellar red dots, a loss of eyebrows, and prominent venous vasculature in the forehead. Facial hyperpigmentation may occur in dark-skinned patients if association with lichen planus pigmentosus is present.

=== Associations ===
Frontal fibrosing alopecia has been most often reported in post-menopausal women with higher levels of affluence and a negative smoking history. Autoimmune disease is found in 30% of patients.

== Pathogenesis ==
Although the pathogenesis of frontal fibrosing alopecia is poorly understood, autoimmune reaction and hormonal factors may play a role.

== Diagnostic ==
Perifollicular erythema and scarring white patches are seen on dermoscopy. On scalp biopsy, lymphocytic and granulomatous perifolliculitis with eccentric atrophy of follicular epithelia and perifollicular fibrosis are visualized.

=== Differential diagnosis ===
Important diagnoses to consider include female pattern hair loss (FPHL), chronic telogen effluvium (CTE), and alopecia areata (AA). FPHL is a non-scarring progressive miniaturization of the hair follicle with one of three different characteristic patterns. CTE is an idiopathic disease causing increased hair shedding and bi-temporal recession, usually in middle aged women. AA is an autoimmune attack of hair follicles that usually causes hair to fall out in small round patches.

== Treatment ==
Improvement or stabilization of the condition has been reported with topical and intralesional corticosteroids, antibiotics, hydroxychloroquine, topical and oral immunomodulators, tacrolimus, and most recently, 5α-reductase inhibitors. In one study, the use of antiandrogens (finasteride or dutasteride) was associated with improvement in 47% and stabilization in 53% of patients Recently, successful treatment of facial papules in patients with frontal fibrosing alopecia was described with oral isotretinoin.

== See also ==
- Skin lesion
