= Ludwig scale =

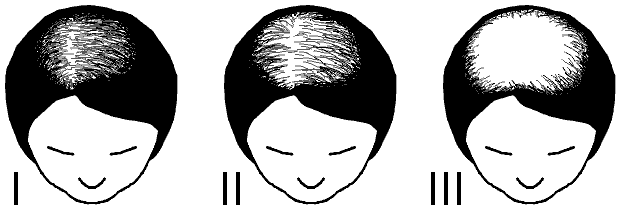
- Ludwig scale for female pattern baldness.
- Purpose: assess female baldness

The Ludwig scale is a method of classifying female pattern baldness (androgenic alopecia), and ranges from stages I to III.

Stage I begins with thinning on the top of the head. In stage II the scalp starts to show. All of the hair at the crown of the head may be lost when the hair loss progresses to stage III. However, the scale is used merely for general categorization. Many women do not actually fit into the Ludwig stages.

== See also ==
- Hamilton–Norwood scale for male pattern baldness
