= Frictional alopecia =

Dermatological condition

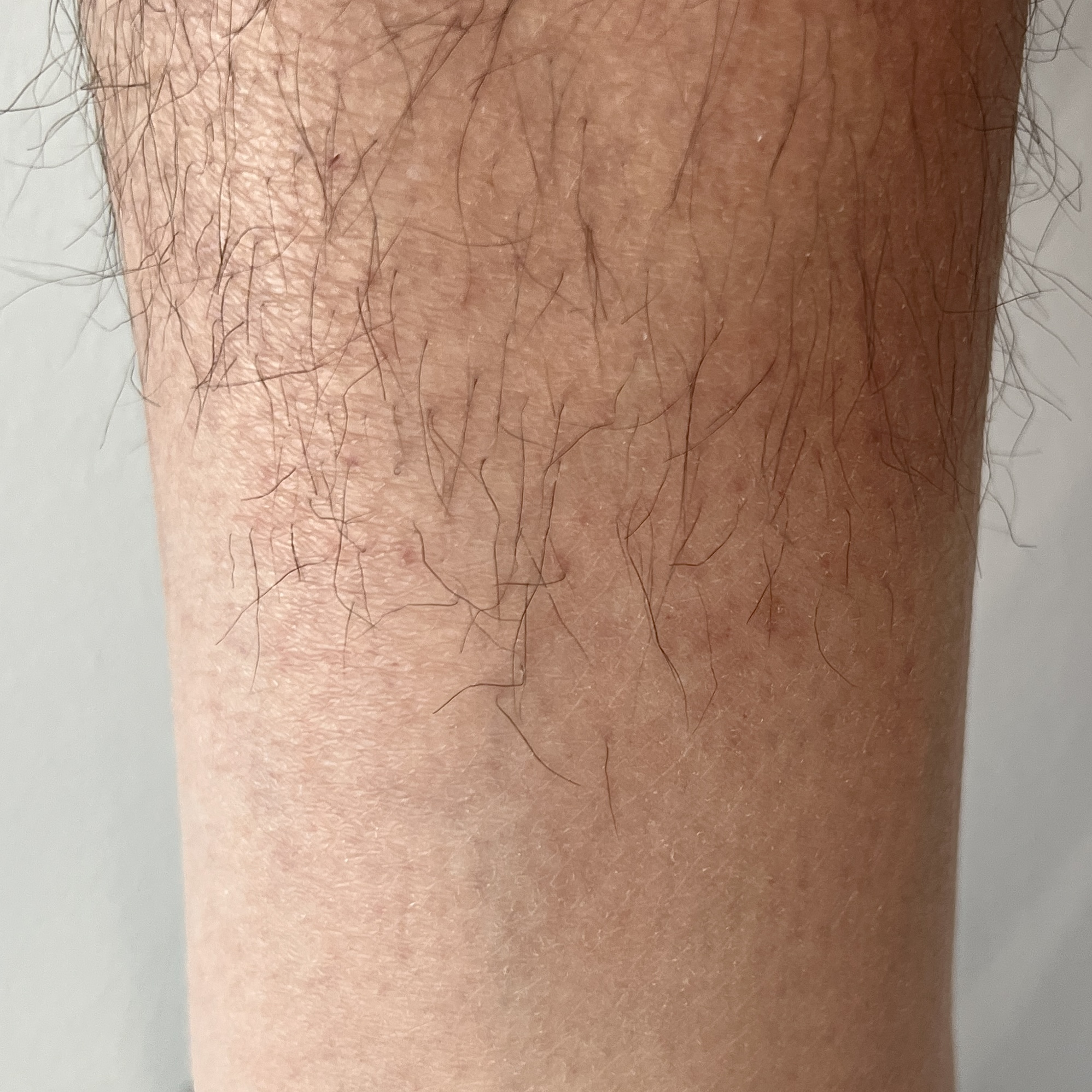
- Hairlessness of skin typically covered by sock (below), in contrast to uncovered skin (above), consistent with frictional alopecia
- Specialty: Dermatology
- Symptoms: Alopecia
- Duration: Years
- Types: Trichoteiromania (self-inflicted)
- Causes: Repetitive friction against skin
- Diagnostic method: Dermoscopy
- Differential diagnosis: Alopecia areata
- Treatment: Avoidance of friction source

Frictional alopecia is the loss of hair that is caused by rubbing of the hair, follicles, or skin around the follicle. The most typical example of this is the loss of ankle hair among people who wear socks constantly for years. The hair may not grow back even years after the source of friction has ended.

== Signs and symptoms ==
Frictional alopecia causes hair loss secondary to frequent rubbing of the hair.

== Causes ==
Frictional alopecia is a non-scarring alopecia that may result from something rubbing against the hairs or from a self-inflicted tic disorder.

Friction alopecia, when self-inflicting, is called trichoteiromania, a psychiatric condition marked by obsessive hair rubbing.

Friction alopecia can be brought on by something rubbing against hairs repeatedly. It has been reported in the distribution of socks and shoes on the lower extremities of men, on the back of the lower extremities from water slides, in gymnasts performing head stands and rollovers on the balance beam, and in a jogger with a tight-banded headphone on her scalp.

When no frictional etiology can be identified, associations with peripheral nerve disease, thyroid dysfunction, and androgenetic alopecia have been proposed.

== Diagnosis ==
Histology reveals no abnormal alterations. Alopecia areata is a significant differential diagnosis. It is possible to distinguish between the two entities using dermoscopy.

== Treatment ==
Reassurance and avoiding the trigger factor are part of the treatment for frictional alopecia.
