= Hair loss =

Loss of hair from the head or body

- Other names: Alopecia, baldness
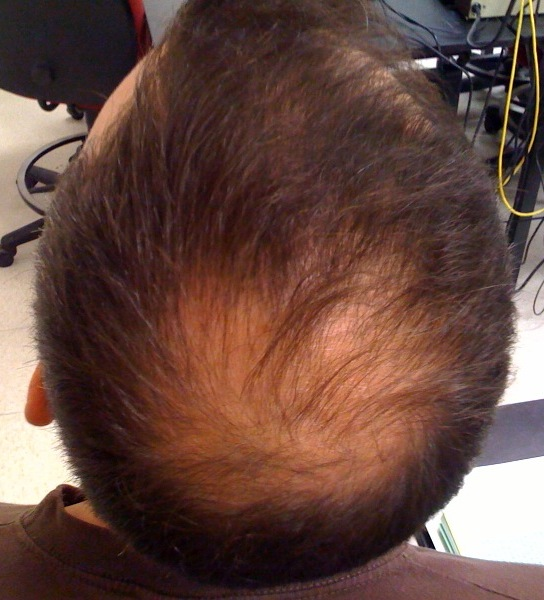
- A bald spot on a man
- Pronunciation: Alopecia: /ˌæləˈpiːʃ(i)ə, -si.ə/
- Specialty: Dermatology
- Symptoms: Loss of hair from part of the head or body.
- Complications: Psychological distress
- Types: Male-pattern hair loss, female-pattern hair loss, alopecia areata, telogen effluvium
- Treatment: Accepting the condition, medications, shaving of balding areas, surgery
- Medication: Pattern hair loss: minoxidil, finasteride Alopecia areata: steroid injections
- Frequency: 50% of males, 25% of females (pattern hair loss by age 50)

Explanatory video with English subtitles: What causes hair loss? (in 96 seconds)

Hair loss, also known as alopecia or baldness, refers to a loss of hair from part of the head or body. Typically at least the head is involved. The severity of hair loss can vary from a small area to the entire body. Inflammation or scarring is not usually present. Hair loss in some people causes psychological distress.

Common types include male- or female-pattern hair loss, alopecia areata, and a thinning of hair known as telogen effluvium. The cause of male-pattern hair loss is a combination of genetics and male hormones; the cause of female pattern hair loss is unclear; the cause of alopecia areata is autoimmune; and the cause of telogen effluvium is typically a physically or psychologically stressful event. Telogen effluvium is very common following pregnancy.

Less common causes of hair loss without inflammation or scarring include the pulling out of hair, certain medications including chemotherapy, HIV/AIDS, hypothyroidism, and malnutrition including vitamin B_{12} and iron deficiencies. Causes of hair loss that occurs with scarring or inflammation include fungal infection, lupus erythematosus, radiation therapy, and sarcoidosis. Diagnosis of hair loss is partly based on the areas affected.

Treatment of pattern hair loss may simply involve accepting the condition, which can also include shaving one's head. Interventions that can be tried include the medication minoxidil (or finasteride) and hair transplant surgery. Alopecia areata may be treated by steroid injections in the affected area, but these need to be frequently repeated to be effective. Hair loss is a common experience. Pattern hair loss by age 50 affects about half of men and a quarter of women. About 2% of people develop alopecia areata at some point in time.

== Terminology ==
Baldness is the partial or complete lack of hair growth, and part of the wider topic of "hair thinning". The degree and pattern of baldness varies, but its most common cause is androgenic hair loss, alopecia androgenetica, or alopecia seborrheica, with the last term primarily used in Europe.

=== Hypotrichosis ===
Hypotrichosis is a condition of abnormal hair patterns, predominantly loss or reduction. It occurs, most frequently, by the growth of vellus hair in areas of the body that normally produce terminal hair. Typically, the individual's hair growth is normal after birth, but shortly thereafter the hair is shed and replaced with sparse, abnormal hair growth. The new hair is typically fine, short and brittle, and may lack pigmentation. Baldness may be present by the time the subject is 25 years old.

== Signs and symptoms ==
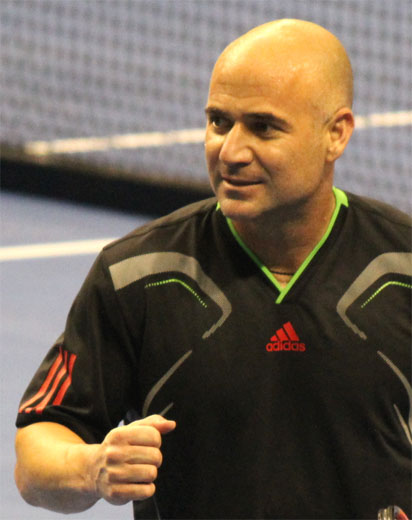
A case of mid-frontal baldness: Andre Agassi

Symptoms of hair loss include hair loss in patches usually in circular patterns, dandruff, skin lesions, and scarring. Alopecia areata (mild – medium level) usually shows in unusual hair loss areas, e.g., eyebrows, backside of the head or above the ears, areas the male pattern baldness usually does not affect. In male-pattern hair loss, loss and thinning begin at the temples and the crown and hair either thins out or falls out. Female-pattern hair loss occurs at the frontal and parietal.

People have between 100,000 and 150,000 hairs on their head. The number of strands normally lost in a day varies but on average is 100. In order to maintain a normal volume, hair must be replaced at the same rate at which it is lost. The first signs of hair thinning that people will often notice are more hairs than usual left in the hairbrush after brushing or in the basin after shampooing. Styling can also reveal areas of thinning, such as a wider parting or a thinning crown.

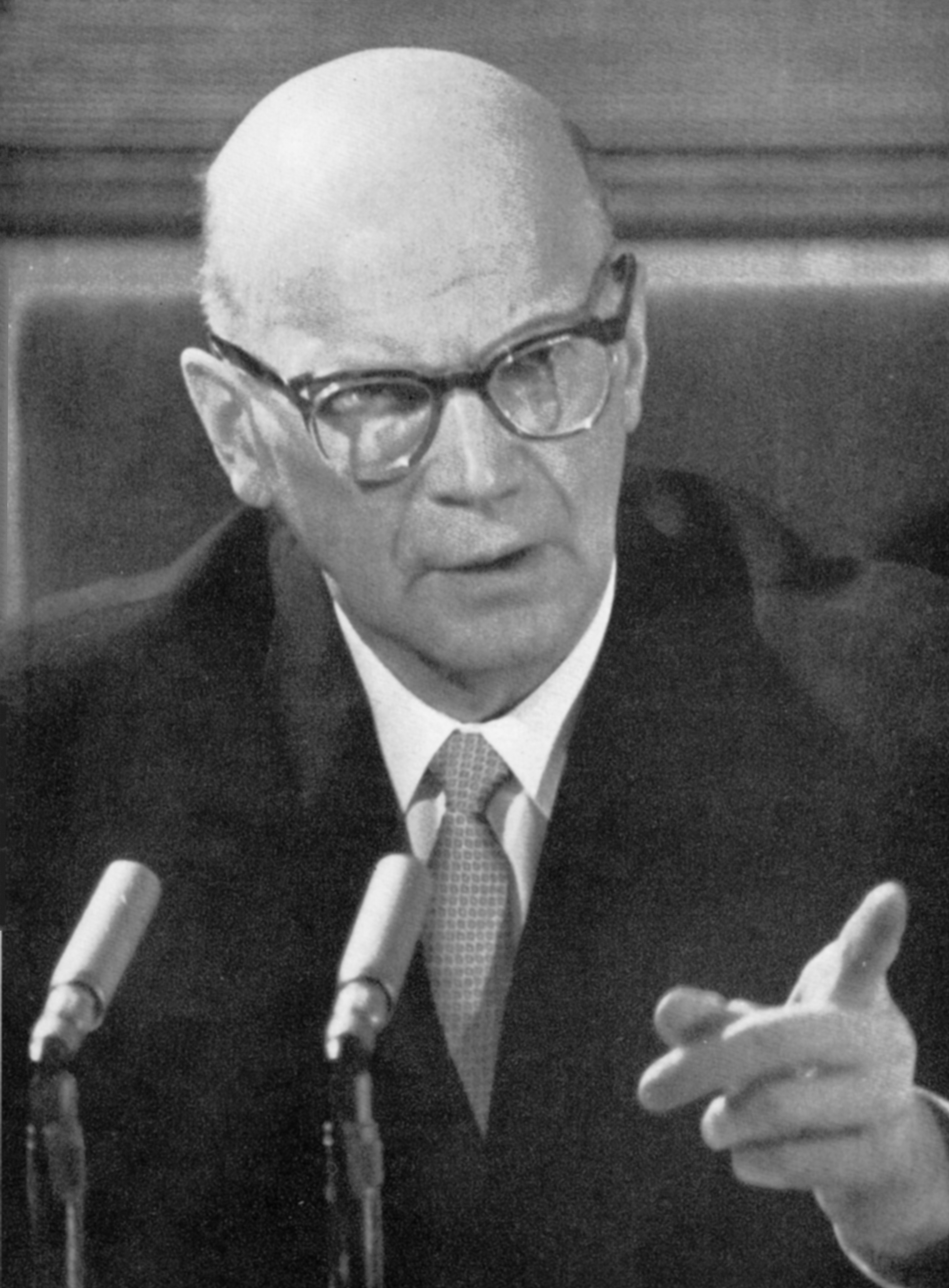
Throughout his political career, Urho Kekkonen, the President of Finland, was well known for his baldness. He was last known to have had hair in about the 1920s. This photo is of Kekkonen in 1959.

=== Skin conditions ===
A substantially blemished face, back and limbs could point to cystic acne. The most severe form of the condition, cystic acne, arises from the same hormonal imbalances that cause hair loss and is associated with dihydrotestosterone production.

=== Psychological ===
The psychology of hair thinning is a complex issue. Hair is considered an essential part of overall identity: especially for women, for whom it often represents femininity and attractiveness. Men typically associate a full head of hair with youth and vigor. People experiencing hair thinning often find themselves in a situation where their physical appearance is at odds with their own self-image and commonly worry that they appear older than they are or less attractive to others. Psychological problems due to baldness, if present, are typically most severe at the onset of symptoms. Two meta analyses on androgenetic alopecia revealed psychosocial distress levels to be moderate, on average, rather than severe and that balding men were no more likely to have depression or self esteem issues compared to non-balding men.

Hair loss induced by cancer chemotherapy has been reported to cause changes in self-concept and body image. Body image does not return to the previous state after regrowth of hair for a majority of patients. In such cases, patients have difficulties expressing their feelings (alexithymia) and may be more prone to avoiding family conflicts. Family therapy can help families to cope with these psychological problems if they arise.

== Causes ==
Although not completely understood, hair loss can have many causes:

=== Pattern hair loss ===
Male pattern hair loss is believed to be due to a combination of genetics and the male hormone dihydrotestosterone. The cause in female pattern hair loss remains unclear.

=== Infection ===
- Dissecting cellulitis of the scalp
- Fungal infections (such as tinea capitis)
- Folliculitis from various causes
  - Demodex folliculitis, caused by Demodex folliculorum, a microscopic mite that feeds on the sebum produced by the sebaceous glands, denies hair essential nutrients and can cause thinning. Demodex folliculorum is not present on every scalp and is more likely to live in an excessively oily scalp environment.
- Secondary syphilis

=== Drugs ===
- Temporary or permanent hair loss can be caused by several medications, including those for blood pressure problems, diabetes, heart disease and cholesterol. Any that affect the body's hormone balance can have a pronounced effect: these include the contraceptive pill, hormone replacement therapy, steroids and acne medications.
- Some treatments used to cure mycotic infections can cause massive hair loss.
- Medications (side effects from drugs, including chemotherapy, anabolic steroids, and birth control pills)

=== Trauma ===
- Traction alopecia is most commonly found in people with ponytails or cornrows who pull on their hair with excessive force. In addition, rigorous brushing and heat styling, rough scalp massage can damage the cuticle, the hard outer casing of the hair. This causes individual strands to become weak and break off, reducing overall hair volume.
- Frictional alopecia is hair loss caused by rubbing of the hair or follicles, most infamously around the ankles of men from socks, where even if socks are no longer worn, the hair often will not grow back.
- Trichotillomania is the loss of hair caused by compulsive pulling and bending of the hairs. Onset of this disorder tends to begin around the onset of puberty and usually continues through adulthood. Due to the constant extraction of the hair roots, permanent hair loss can occur.
- Traumas such as childbirth, major surgery, poisoning, and severe stress may cause a hair loss condition known as telogen effluvium, in which a large number of hairs enter the resting phase at the same time, causing shedding and subsequent thinning. The condition also presents as a side effect of chemotherapy – while targeting dividing cancer cells, this treatment also affects hair's growth phase with the result that almost 90% of hairs fall out soon after chemotherapy starts.
- Radiation to the scalp, as when radiotherapy is applied to the head for the treatment of certain cancers there, can cause baldness of the irradiated areas.

=== After pregnancy ===
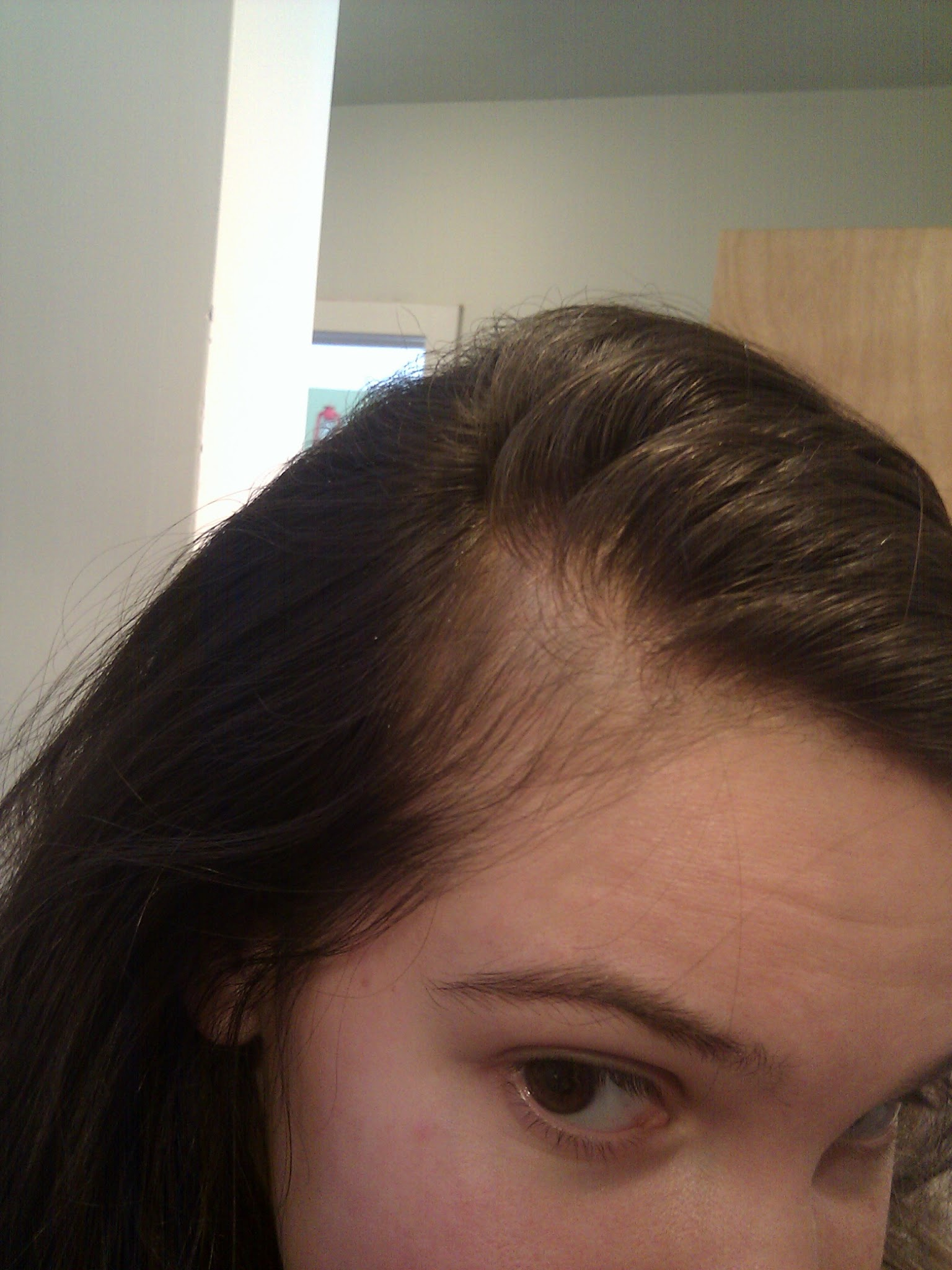
Postpartum telogen effluvium

Hair loss often follows childbirth in the postpartum period without causing baldness (telogen effluvium). During pregnancy, the hair is thicker owing to increased circulating estrogens. Approximately three months after giving birth (typically between 2 and 5 months), estrogen levels drop and hair loss occurs, often particularly noticeably around the hairline and temple area. Hair typically grows back normally and treatment is not indicated. A similar situation occurs in women taking the fertility-stimulating drug clomiphene.

=== Other causes ===
- Autoimmune disease. Alopecia areata is an autoimmune disorder also known as "spot baldness" that can result in hair loss ranging from just one location (Alopecia areata monolocularis) to every hair on the entire body (Alopecia areata universalis). Although thought to be caused by hair follicles becoming dormant, what triggers alopecia areata is not known. In most cases the condition corrects itself, but it can also spread to the entire scalp (alopecia totalis) or to the entire body (alopecia universalis).
- Skin diseases and cancer. Localized or diffuse hair loss may also occur in cicatricial alopecia (lupus erythematosus, lichen plano pilaris, folliculitis decalvans, central centrifugal cicatricial alopecia, postmenopausal frontal fibrosing alopecia, etc.). Tumours and skin outgrowths also induce localized baldness (sebaceous nevus, basal cell carcinoma, squamous cell carcinoma). Tumor alopecia is the hair loss in the immediate vicinity of either benign or malignant tumors of the scalp.
- Hypothyroidism (an under-active thyroid) and the side effects of its related medications can cause hair loss, typically frontal, which is particularly associated with thinning of the outer third of the eyebrows (also seen with syphilis). Hyperthyroidism (an over-active thyroid) can also cause hair loss, which is parietal rather than frontal.
- Sebaceous cysts. Temporary loss of hair can occur in areas where sebaceous cysts are present for considerable duration (normally one to several weeks).
- Congenital triangular alopecia – It is a triangular, or oval in some cases, shaped patch of hair loss in the temple area of the scalp that occurs mostly in young children. The affected area mainly contains vellus hair follicles or no hair follicles at all, but it does not expand. Its causes are unknown, and although it is a permanent condition, it does not have any other effect on the affected individuals.
- Hair growth conditions. Gradual thinning of hair with age is a natural condition known as involutional alopecia. This is caused by an increasing number of hair follicles switching from the growth, or anagen, phase into a resting phase, or telogen phase, so that remaining hairs become shorter and fewer in number. An unhealthy scalp environment can play a significant role in hair thinning by contributing to miniaturization or causing damage.
- Obesity. Obesity-induced stress, such as that induced by a high-fat diet (HFD), targets hair follicle stem cells (HFSCs) to accelerate hair thinning in mice. It is likely that similar molecular mechanism play a role in human hair loss.

Other causes of hair loss include:

- Alopecia mucinosa
- Biotinidase deficiency
- Chronic inflammation
- Diabetes
- Pseudopelade of Brocq
- Telogen effluvium
- Tufted folliculitis

=== Genetics ===
Genetic forms of localized autosomal recessive hypotrichosis include:

Type	OMIM	Gene	Locus
LAH1	607903	DSG4	18q12
LAH2	604379	LIPH	3q27
LAH3	611452	P2RY5	13q14.12-q14.2

== Pathophysiology ==
Hair follicle growth occurs in cycles. Each cycle consists of a long growing phase (anagen), a short transitional phase (catagen) and a short resting phase (telogen). At the end of the resting phase, the hair falls out (exogen) and a new hair starts growing in the follicle, beginning the cycle again.

Normally, about 40 (0–78 in men) hairs reach the end of their resting phase each day and fall out. When more than 100 hairs fall out per day, clinical hair loss (telogen effluvium) may occur. A disruption of the growing phase causes abnormal loss of anagen hairs (anagen effluvium).

== Diagnosis ==
Because they are not usually associated with an increased loss rate, male-pattern and female-pattern hair loss do not generally require testing. If hair loss occurs in a young man with no family history, drug use could be the cause.

- The pull test helps to evaluate diffuse scalp hair loss. Gentle traction is exerted on a group of hairs (about 40–60) on three different areas of the scalp. The number of extracted hairs is counted and examined under a microscope. Normally, fewer than three hairs per area should come out with each pull. If more than ten hairs are obtained, the pull test is considered positive.
- The pluck test is conducted by pulling hair out "by the roots". The root of the plucked hair is examined under a microscope to determine the phase of growth, and is used to diagnose a defect of telogen, anagen, or systemic disease. Telogen hairs have tiny bulbs without sheaths at their roots. Telogen effluvium shows an increased percentage of hairs upon examination. Anagen hairs have sheaths attached to their roots. Anagen effluvium shows a decrease in telogen-phase hairs and an increased number of broken hairs.
- Scalp biopsy is used when the diagnosis is unsure; a biopsy allows for differing between scarring and nonscarring forms. Hair samples are taken from areas of inflammation, usually around the border of the bald patch.
- Daily hair counts are normally done when the pull test is negative. It is done by counting the number of hairs lost. The hair from the first morning combing or during washing should be counted. The hair is collected in a clear plastic bag for 14 days. The strands are recorded. If the hair count is >100/day, it is considered abnormal except after shampooing, where hair counts will be up to 250 and be normal.
- Trichoscopy is a noninvasive method of examining hair and scalp. The test may be performed with the use of a handheld dermoscope or a video dermoscope. It allows differential diagnosis of hair loss in most cases.

There are two types of identification tests for female pattern baldness: the Ludwig Scale and the Savin Scale. Both track the progress of diffused thinning, which typically begins on the crown of the head behind the hairline, and becomes gradually more pronounced. For male pattern baldness, the Hamilton–Norwood scale tracks the progress of a receding hairline and/or a thinning crown, through to a horseshoe-shaped ring of hair around the head and on to total baldness.

In almost all cases of thinning, and especially in cases of severe hair loss, it is recommended to seek advice from a doctor or dermatologist. Many types of thinning have an underlying genetic or health-related cause, which a qualified professional will be able to diagnose.

== Management ==
=== Hiding hair loss ===
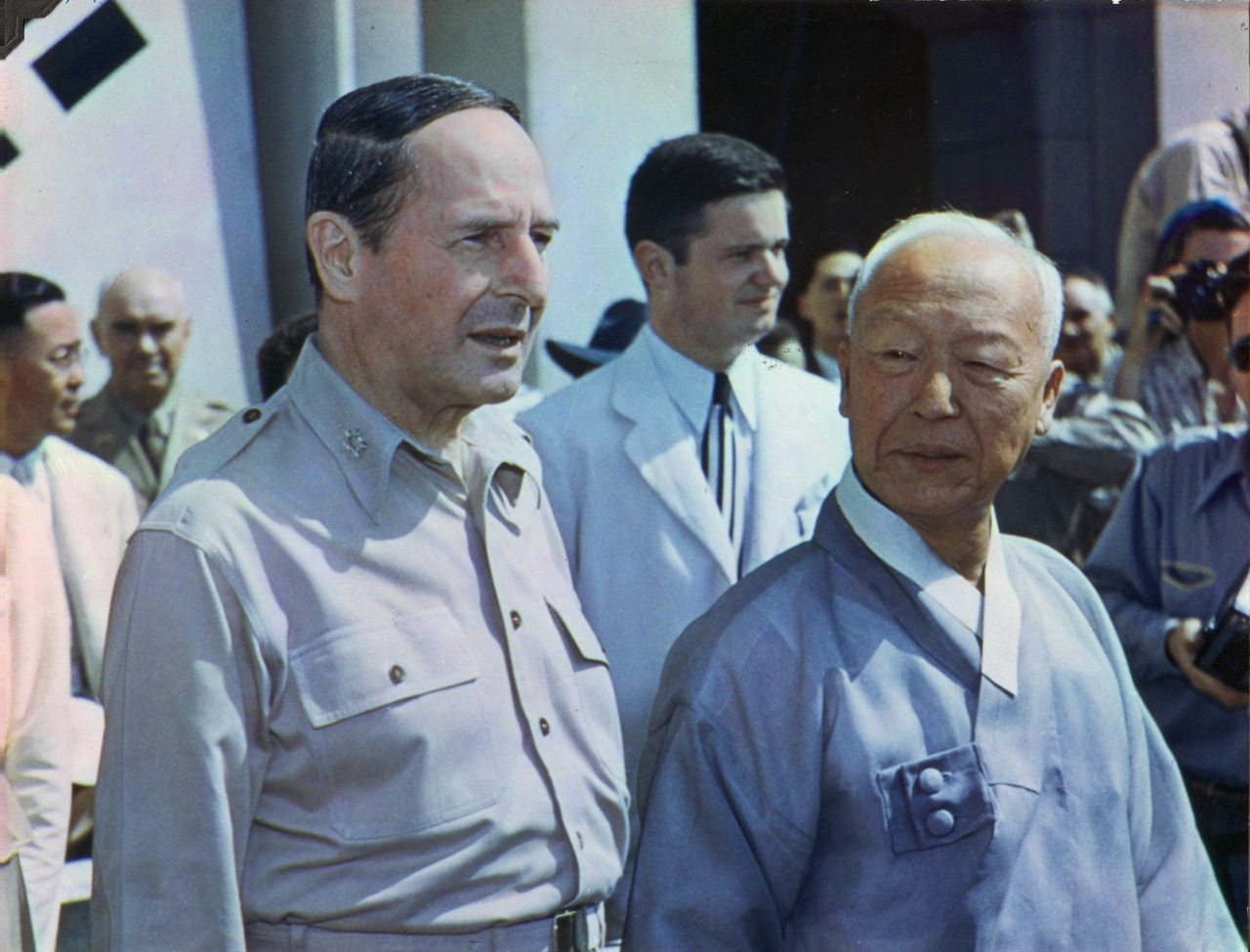
General Douglas MacArthur with a comb over

==== Head ====
One method of hiding hair loss is the comb over, which involves restyling the remaining hair to cover the balding area. It is usually a temporary solution, useful only while the area of hair loss is small. As the hair loss increases, a comb over becomes less effective.

Another method is to wear a hat or a hairpiece such as a wig or toupee. The wig is a layer of artificial or natural hair made to resemble a typical hair style. In most cases the hair is artificial. Wigs vary widely in quality and cost. In the United States, the best wigs – those that look like real hair – cost up to tens of thousands of dollars. Organizations also collect individuals' donations of their own natural hair to be made into wigs for young cancer patients who have lost their hair due to chemotherapy or other cancer treatment in addition to any type of hair loss.

==== Eyebrows ====
Though not as common as the loss of hair on the head, chemotherapy, hormone imbalance, forms of hair loss, and other factors can also cause loss of hair in the eyebrows. Loss of growth in the outer one third of the eyebrow is often associated with hypothyroidism. Artificial eyebrows are available to replace missing eyebrows or to cover patchy eyebrows. Eyebrow embroidery is another option which involves the use of a blade to add pigment to the eyebrows. This gives a natural 3D look for those who are worried about an artificial look and it lasts for two years. Micropigmentation (permanent makeup tattooing) is also available for those who want the look to be permanent.

=== Medications ===
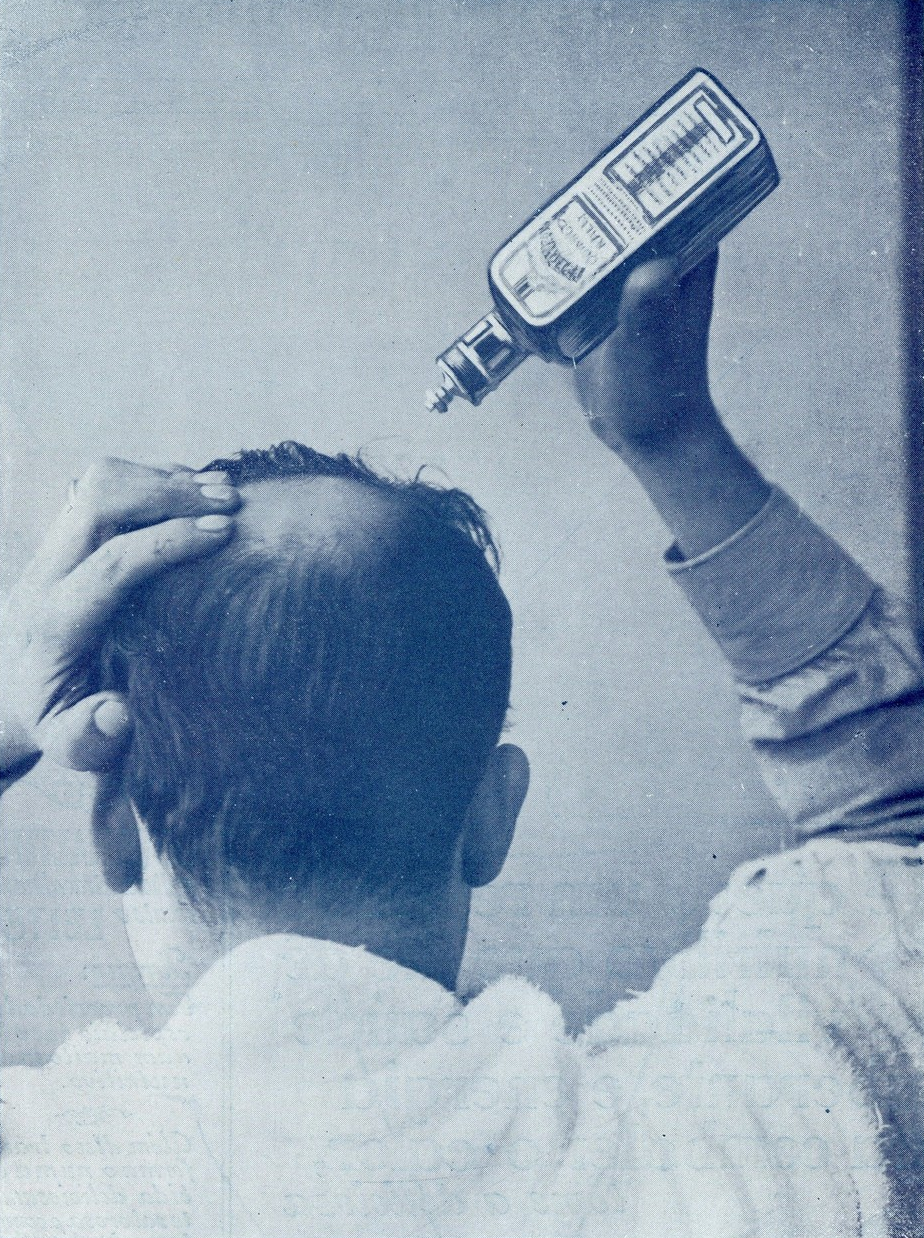
Portuguese advertisement for a hair-loss product from the 1940s

Treatments for the various forms of hair loss have limited success. Three medications have evidence to support their use in male pattern hair loss: minoxidil, finasteride, and dutasteride. They typically work better to prevent further hair loss, than to regrow lost hair. On June 13, 2022, the U.S. Food and Drug Administration (FDA) approved Olumiant (baricitinib) for adults with severe alopecia areata. It is the first FDA approved drug for systemic treatment, or treatment for any area of the body.

- Minoxidil (Rogaine) is a nonprescription medication approved for male pattern baldness and alopecia areata. In a liquid or foam, it is rubbed into the scalp twice a day. Some people have an allergic reaction to the propylene glycol in the minoxidil solution and a minoxidil foam was developed without propylene glycol. Not all users will regrow hair. Minoxidil may also be taken orally although this route of administration is not approved by the FDA. The longer the hair has stopped growing, the less likely minoxidil will regrow hair. Minoxidil is not effective for other causes of hair loss. Hair regrowth can take 1 to 6 months to begin. Treatment must be continued indefinitely. If the treatment is stopped, hair loss resumes. Any regrown hair and any hair susceptible to being lost, while Minoxidil was used, will be lost. Most frequent side effects are mild scalp irritation, allergic contact dermatitis, and unwanted hair in other parts of the body.
- Finasteride (Propecia) is used in male-pattern hair loss in a pill form, taken 1 milligram per day. It is not indicated for women and is not recommended in pregnant women (as it is known to cause birth defects in fetuses). Treatment is effective starting within 6 weeks of treatment. Finasteride causes an increase in hair retention, the weight of hair, and some increase in regrowth. Side effects in about 2% of males include decreased sex drive, erectile dysfunction, and ejaculatory dysfunction. Treatment should be continued as long as positive results occur. Once treatment is stopped, hair loss resumes.
- Corticosteroids injections into the scalp can be used to treat alopecia areata. This type of treatment is repeated on a monthly basis. Oral pills for extensive hair loss may be used for alopecia areata. Results may take up to a month to be seen.
- Immunosuppressants applied to the scalp have been shown to temporarily reverse alopecia areata, though the side effects of some of these drugs make such therapy questionable.
- There is some tentative evidence that anthralin may be useful for treating alopecia areata.
- Hormonal modulators (oral contraceptives or antiandrogens such as spironolactone and flutamide) can be used for female-pattern hair loss associated with hyperandrogenemia.

=== Surgery ===
Hair transplantation is usually carried out under local anesthetic. A surgeon will move healthy hair from the back and sides of the head to areas of thinning. The procedure can take between four and eight hours, and additional sessions can be carried out to make hair even thicker. Transplanted hair falls out within a few weeks, but regrows permanently within months.

- Surgical options, such as follicle transplants, scalp flaps, and hair loss reduction, are available. These procedures are generally chosen by those who are self-conscious about their hair loss, but they are expensive and painful, with a risk of infection and scarring. Once surgery has occurred, six to eight months are needed before the quality of new hair can be assessed.
  - Scalp reduction is the process of decreasing of the area of bald skin on the head. In time, the skin on the head becomes flexible and stretched enough that some of it can be surgically removed. After the hairless scalp is removed, the space is closed with hair-covered scalp. Scalp reduction is generally done in combination with hair transplantation to provide a natural-looking hairline, especially those with extensive hair loss.
  - Hairline lowering can sometimes be used to lower a high hairline secondary to hair loss, although there may be a visible scar after further hair loss.
- Wigs are an alternative to medical and surgical treatment; some patients wear a wig or hairpiece. They can be used permanently or temporarily to cover the hair loss. High-quality, natural-looking wigs and hairpieces are available.

=== Chemotherapy ===
Hypothermia caps may be used to prevent hair loss during some kinds of chemotherapy, specifically, when taxanes or anthracyclines are administered. It is not recommended to be used when cancer is present in the skin of the scalp or for lymphoma or leukemia. There are generally only minor side effects from scalp cooling given during chemotherapy.

=== Embracing baldness ===
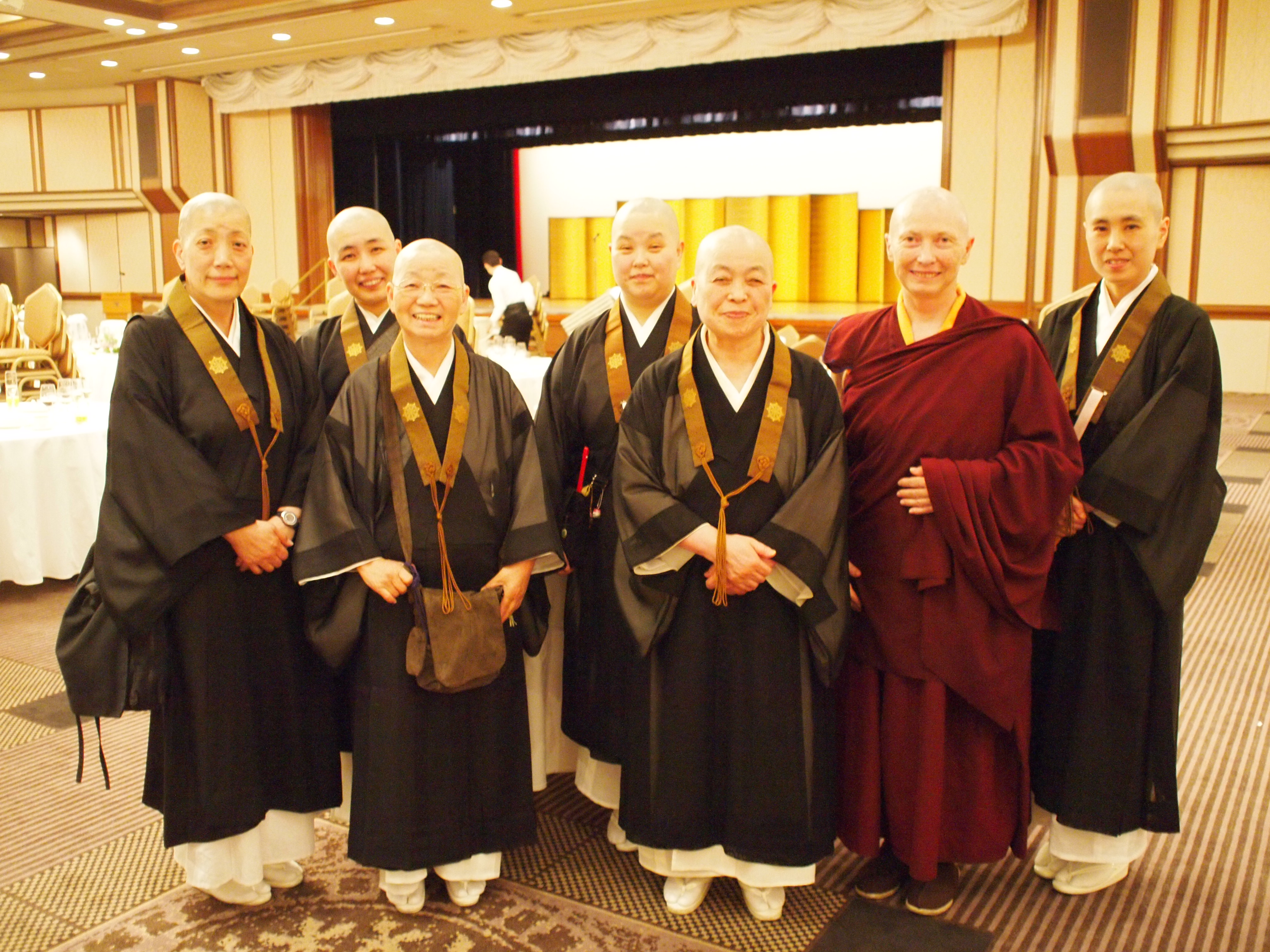
Buddhist nuns with shaved heads

Instead of attempting to conceal their hair loss, some people embrace it by either doing nothing about it or sporting a shaved head. The general public became more accepting of men with shaved heads in the early 1950s, when Russian-American actor Yul Brynner began sporting the look; the resulting phenomenon inspired many of his male fans to shave their heads. Male celebrities then continued to bring mainstream popularity to shaved heads, including athletes such as Michael Jordan and Zinedine Zidane and actors such as Dwayne Johnson, Ben Kingsley, and Jason Statham.

To a lesser extent, female baldness can also be neutrally and positively interpreted in various parts of the world. For example head shaving is not uncommon among Black women, Buddhist nuns, lesbians and some feminists can represent a release from superficial and restrictive appearance norms.

=== Alternative medicine ===
Dietary supplements are not typically recommended. There is only one small trial of saw palmetto which shows tentative benefit in those with mild to moderate androgenetic alopecia. There is no evidence for biotin. Evidence for most other alternative medicine remedies is also insufficient. There was no good evidence for ginkgo, aloe vera, ginseng, bergamot, hibiscus, or sophora as of 2011.

Many people use unproven treatments to treat hair loss. Egg oil, in Indian, Japanese, Unani (Roghan Baiza Murgh) and Chinese traditional medicine, was traditionally used as a treatment for hair loss.

== Research ==
Research is looking into connections between hair loss and other health issues. While there has been speculation about a connection between early-onset male pattern hair loss and heart disease, a review of articles from 1954 to 1999 found no conclusive connection between baldness and coronary artery disease. The dermatologists who conducted the review suggested further study was needed.

Environmental factors are under review. A 2007 study indicated that smoking may be a factor associated with age-related hair loss among Asian men. The study controlled for age and family history, and found statistically significant positive associations between moderate or severe male pattern hair loss and smoking status.

Vertex baldness is associated with an increased risk of coronary heart disease (CHD) and the relationship depends upon the severity of baldness, while frontal baldness is not. Thus, vertex baldness might be a marker of CHD and is more closely associated with atherosclerosis than frontal baldness.

=== Hair follicle aging ===
A key aspect of hair loss with age is the aging of the hair follicle. Ordinarily, hair follicle renewal is maintained by the stem cells associated with each follicle. Aging of the hair follicle appears to be primed by a sustained cellular response to the DNA damage that accumulates in renewing stem cells during aging. This damage response involves the proteolysis of type XVII collagen by neutrophil elastase in response to DNA damage in hair follicle stem cells. Proteolysis of collagen leads to elimination of the damaged cells and, consequently, to terminal hair follicle miniaturization.

=== Hedgehog signaling ===
In June 2022 the University of California, Irvine announced that researchers have discovered that hedgehog signaling in murine fibroblasts induces new hair growth and hair multiplication while hedgehog activation increases fibroblast heterogeneity and drives new cell states. A new signaling molecule called SCUBE3 potently stimulates hair growth and may offer a therapeutic treatment for androgenetic alopecia.

== Etymology ==
The term alopecia (/ˌæləˈpiːʃiə/) is from the Classical Greek ἀλώπηξ, alōpēx, meaning "fox". The origin of this usage is because this animal sheds its coat twice a year, or because in ancient Greece foxes often lost hair because of mange.

== See also ==
- Alopecia in animals
- Lichen planopilaris
- List of conditions caused by problems with junctional proteins
- Locks of Love – charity that provides hair prosthetics to alopecia patients
- Psychogenic alopecia
