= Karin Schallreuter =

German dermatologist

Karin Uta Schallreuter is a German-born medical scientist, and emerita professor for Clinical and Experimental Dermatology at the University of Bradford, England. She has researched the fields of vitiligo and eczema.

She has a medical degree from the University of Hamburg and did post-doctoral research at the University of Minnesota, before being appointed Professor for Clinical and Experimental Dermatology at the University of Bradford in 1995.

Her research led to the development of pseudocatalase cream for the treatment of vitiligo. She led the Institute for Pigmentary Disorders in Greifswald, Germany, associated with the University of Greifswald, which offered treatments for vitiligo including trips to Jordan for a three-week treatment combining use of this cream with climatotherapy in the UVB-rich climate of Jordan. The institute closed on 1 January 2021 for economic reasons.

== Selected publications ==
- Schallreuter, Karin U.; Moore, Jeremy; et al. (September 1999). "In Vivo and In Vitro Evidence for Hydrogen Peroxide (H2O2) Accumulation in the Epidermis of Patients with Vitiligo and its Successful Removal by a UVB-Activated Pseudocatalase". Journal of Investigative Dermatology Symposium Proceedings. 4 (1): 91–96. doi:10.1038/sj.jidsp.5640189. PMID 10537016.
- Schallreuter, Karin U.; Krüger, Christian; et al. (July 2008). "From basic research to the bedside: efficacy of topical treatment with pseudocatalase PC-KUS in 71 children with vitiligo". International Journal of Dermatology. 47 (7): 743–753. doi:10.1111/j.1365-4632.2008.03660.x. PMID 18613887. S2CID 23531285.
