= Cosmesis =

Preservation, restoration, or bestowing of bodily beauty

Cosmesis is the preservation, restoration, or bestowing of bodily beauty. In the medical context, it usually refers to the surgical correction of a disfiguring defect, or the cosmetic improvements made by a surgeon following incisions. Its use is generally limited to the additional, usually minor, steps that the surgeon (who is generally operating for noncosmetic indications) takes to improve the aesthetic appearance of the scars associated with the operation. Typical actions include removal of damaged tissue, mitigation of tension on the wound, and/or using fine (thin) sutures to close the outer layer of skin.

Cosmetic surgery is the portion of plastic surgery that concerns itself with the elective improvement of cosmesis.

== Prosthetic limbs ==
The practice of cosmesis, the creation of lifelike limbs made from silicone or PVC, has grown in popularity. Such prosthetics, such as artificial hands, can now be made to mimic the appearance of real limbs, complete with freckles, veins, hair, fingerprints, and even tattoos. Custom-made silicone cosmeses are generally more expensive, costing thousands of US dollars depending on the level of detail. Standard cosmeses come ready-made in various sizes, though they are often not as realistic as their custom-made counterparts. Another option is the custom-made silicone cover, which can be made to match a person's skin tone, but not details such as freckles or wrinkles. Cosmeses are attached to the body using an adhesive, suction, form-fitting, stretchable skin, or a skin sleeve. Cosmeses act as a barrier from dirt, water and other particles, thus protecting the technology inside the glove.
