= International Journal of Trichology =

- Discipline: Trichology
- Language: English

Publication details
- History: 2009-present
- Publisher: Medknow Publications on behalf of the Hair Research Society of India
- Frequency: Biannual

Standard abbreviations
- ISO 4: Int. J. Trichology

Indexing
- ISSN: 0974-7753 (print); 0974-9241 (web)

Links
- Journal homepage

The International Journal of Trichology is a biannual peer-reviewed open access medical journal published by Medknow Publications on behalf of the Hair Research Society of India. The journal publishes articles on the subject of trichology including forensic trichology. The editor-in-chief is Patrick Yesudian.

== Abstracting and indexing ==
The journal is abstracted and indexed in Scopus, EBSCO databases, and Expanded Academic ASAP.
