= Diethyl lutidinate =

Chemical compound

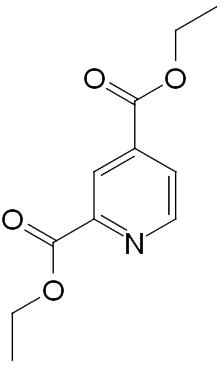

Clinical data
- Trade names: Stemoxydine; Mexoryl SBU
- Other names: Diethyl 2,4-pyridinedicarboxylic acid 2,4-Pyridinedicarboxylic acid diethyl ester
- Routes of administration: topical

Identifiers
- IUPAC name: Diethyl pyridine-2,4-dicarboxylate
- CAS Number: 41438-38-4
- PubChem CID: 170509
- ChemSpider: 149078
- UNII: 4SN4572M5S
- CompTox Dashboard (EPA): DTXSID00961682
- ECHA InfoCard: 100.114.112

Chemical and physical data
- Formula: C_{11}H_{13}NO_{4}
- Molar mass: 223.228 g·mol^{−1}
- 3D model (JSmol): Interactive image
- SMILES: CCOC(=O)C1=CC(=NC=C1)C(=O)OCC
- InChI: InChI=1S/C11H13NO4/c1-3-15-10(13)8-5-6-12-9(7-8)11(14)16-4-2/h5-7H,3-4H2,1-2H3; Key:MUUDQLHCIAOWPR-UHFFFAOYSA-N

Diethyl lutidinate is a chemical compound. It has been studied for its potential use in hair care.

It can be synthesized by reacting lutidinic acid with ethanol at elevated temperature in presence of sulfuric acid.
