= Anagen effluvium =

Pathologic loss of anagen or growth-phase hairs

Anagen effluvium is the pathologic loss of anagen or growth-phase hairs. Classically, it is caused by radiation therapy to the head and systemic chemotherapy, especially with alkylating agents.

Anagen effluvium is due to an acute injury to the hair follicles by an endogenous or exogenous cause, resulting in sudden diffuse shedding of structurally damaged hairs. Diffuse alopecia (hair loss) may occur over a period of days. The alopecia is non-scarring.

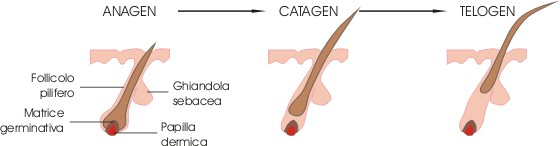

== Pathophysiology ==
Any insult that impairs mitosis of hair follicle keratinocytes can cause anagen effluvium. Disruption to cell division in the hair matrix makes the hair narrowed at its base and susceptible to breakage just above the zone of keratinisation. The necrotic matrix forms plugs consisting of melanin, keratin and inner root sheath which are extruded through the follicular opening. This process is known as trichomalacia. The main causes of anagen effluvium are an infection, a drug, a toxin, radiation or an autoimmune disease.

Toxins that can interrupt hair growth include:

- Chemotherapy agents, usually prescribed to treat cancer, especially when multiple drugs are used or they are in high dose. Severe hair loss is reported from doxorubicin, the nitrosoureas, and cyclophosphamide. Other causes are bleomycin, dactinomycin, daunorubicin, systemic fluorouracil, and high-dose methotrexate.
- Other medicines such as colchicine and ciclosporin (ciclosporin more often causes increased hair growth)
- Poisons such as thallium, arsenic, gold and bismuth.

== Evaluation ==
A biopsy is rarely necessary, as a diagnosis can usually be made on history and physical exam findings alone. If a biopsy is requested or necessary for diagnosis, it can help exclude telogen effluvium. In anagen effluvium, histopathologic evaluation of a punch biopsy of the scalp will exhibit a normal anagen-to-telogen ratio, which is less than 15% telogen hair follicles. If greater than 15% of the hair follicles are in the telogen phase, this more supports a diagnosis of telogen effluvium.

== Treatment ==
The management of anagen effluvium should be aimed at limiting the amount of time the patient has alopecia. To date, several agents have been studied; unfortunately, no treatment appears to be effective in preventing or stopping the hair loss. Although the results have not been impressive in stopping or preventing hair loss, it has been postulated that topical minoxidil is effective in reducing the period of baldness by an average of fifty days. Several studies have described limiting drug delivery to the scalp by using a scalp tourniquet during chemotherapy. If scalp or brain metastases are a possibility, this method should not be used to allow penetration of the chemotherapeutic agent. Another method that has shown success is inducing scalp hypothermia (by keeping ice over the scalp) to a scalp temperature of fewer than 24°C during chemotherapy with daunorubicin, doxorubicin, paclitaxel, vincristine, vinblastine, mechlorethamine, actinomycin D, and epirubicin.

As pharmacologic agents successful in treating and preventing anagen effluvium have not been found, patient education and aesthetic advice on managing hair loss are fundamental to managing androgen effluvium. Expectations should be managed so that patients understand the unfortunate inevitability of the disorder; however, they should also be assured that most cases of anagen effluvium are reversible and they will grow hair once chemotherapy is ceased. Patients should be instructed to avoid chemical trauma to the hair. This includes hot appliances, bleach, or color treatments in the time leading up to and during chemotherapy. If possible, patients should be given resources to obtain hairpieces or protective scarves before hair loss and educated on the benefits such garments offer, including cold protection in addition to the aesthetic component.

== Differential diagnosis ==
The differential diagnosis for anagen effluvium includes other nonscarring alopecias such as telogen effluvium, trichotillomania, and androgenetic alopecia. These entities can be distinguished by history, hair pull test, and trichoscopy. A thorough review of systems should be completed to exclude other causes of hair loss such as nutritional deficiencies, metabolic and endocrine disorders, and infections.

== See also ==
- Telogen effluvium
- Noncicatricial alopecia
- List of cutaneous conditions
