= Telogen effluvium =

Abnormally rapid shedding of hair

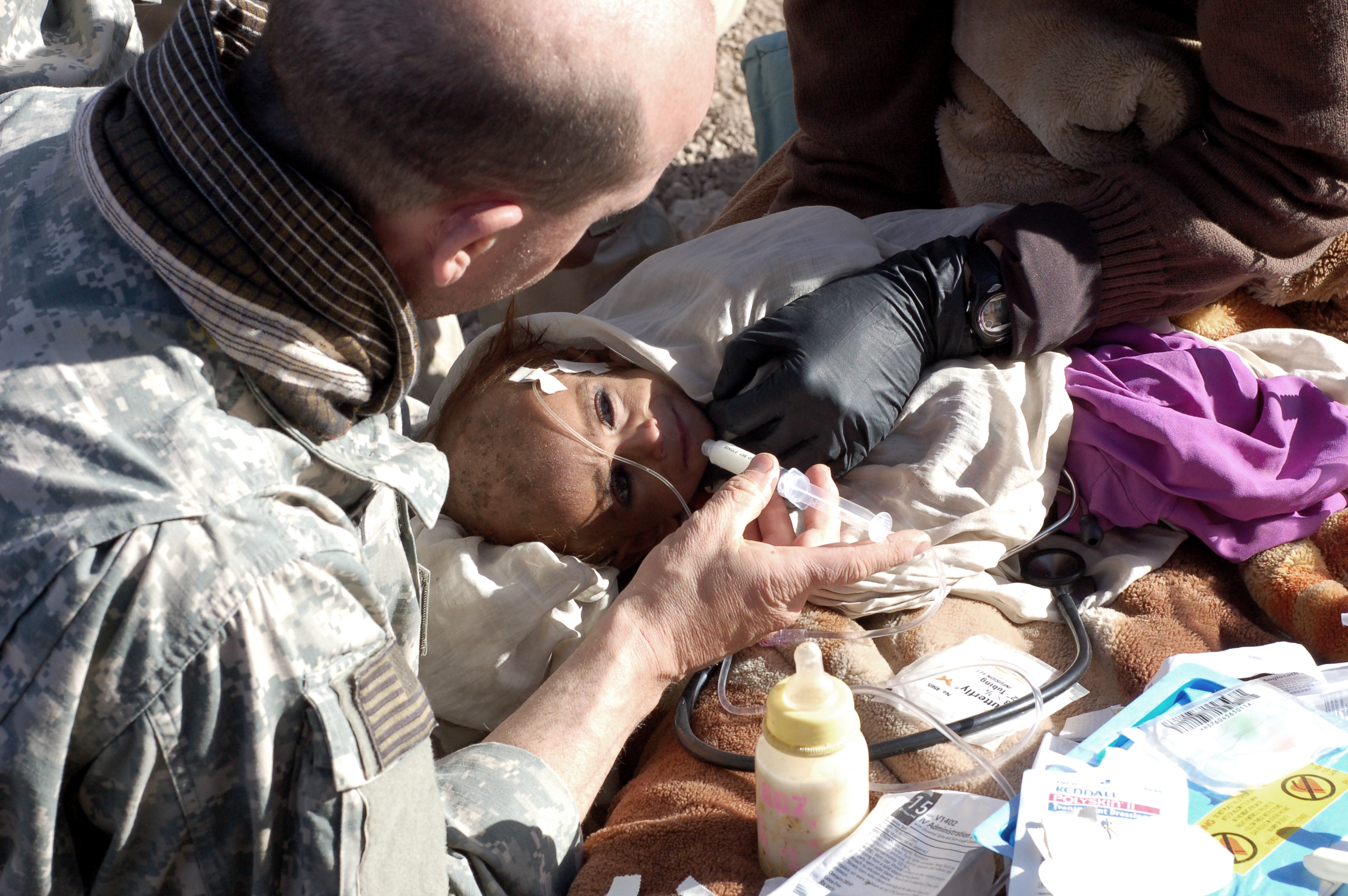
- An Afghan child displaying hair loss due to severe malnutrition
- Specialty: Dermatology

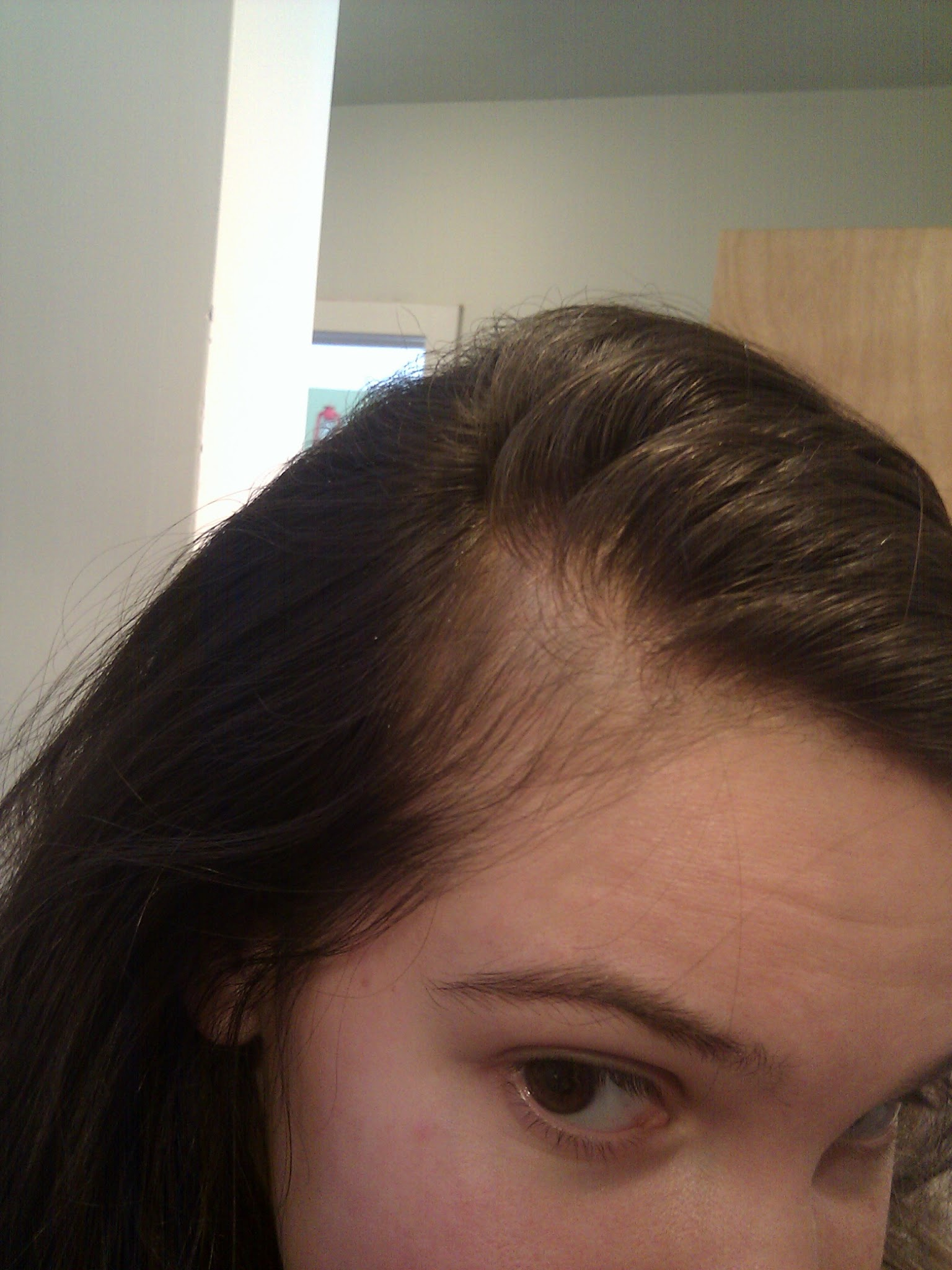
Postpartum hair loss

Telogen effluvium is a scalp disorder characterized by the thinning or shedding of hair resulting from the early entry of hair in the telogen phase (the resting phase of the hair follicle). It is in this phase that telogen hairs begin to shed at an increased rate, where normally the approximate rate of hair loss (having no effect on one's appearance) is 125 hairs per day.

There are 5 potential alterations in the hair cycle that could lead to this shedding: immediate anagen release, delayed anagen release, short anagen syndrome, immediate telogen release, and delayed telogen release.

- Immediate anagen release occurs when follicles leave anagen and are stimulated to enter telogen prematurely. The effects become visible 2–3 months later with increased telogen effluvium.
- Delayed anagen release, most commonly associated with pregnancy, involves the prolongation of anagen under the effect of pregnancy hormones, resulting in delayed but synchronous and heavy postpartum hair shedding.
- Short anagen syndrome is characterized by an idiopathic and persistent telogen hair shedding, as well as the inability to grow hair long. This is a result of the shortening of the duration of anagen, meaning a greater number of telogen hairs at any given time, and is responsible for the majority of chronic TE cases.
- Immediate telogen release generally occurs with drug-induced shortening of telogen leading to the premature reentrance of follicles to anagen, which causes a massive release of club (telogen) hairs. Drugs such as minoxidil can precipitate immediate telogen release.
- Delayed telogen release involves a prolonged telogen phase followed by a delayed transition to anagen. This occurs in animals with synchronous hair cycles that shed their hair or winter coats seasonally. This is also sometimes responsible for seasonal hair loss in humans.

Emotional or physiological stress may result in an alteration of the normal hair cycle and cause the disorder, with potential causes including eating disorders, crash diets, the postpartum period, chronic illness, major surgery, anemia, severe emotional disorders, hypothyroidism, and drugs. Diagnostic tests, which may be performed to verify the diagnosis, include a trichogram, trichoscopy and biopsy. Effluvium can present with similar appearance to alopecia totalis, with further distinction by clinical course, microscopic examination of plucked follicles, or biopsy of the scalp. Histology would show telogen hair follicles in the dermis with minimal inflammation in effluvium, and dense peribulbar lymphocytic infiltrate in alopecia totalis.

Vitamin D levels may also play a role in the normal hair cycle.

Many new cosmetic treatments have been reported, including Stemoxydine, Nioxin, minoxidil, and a leave-on technology combination: caffeine, niacinamide, panthenol, dimethicone, and an acrylate polymer (CNPDA). This treatment has shown to increase the diameter of existing, individual scalp hair fibres by 2–5 μm, yielding a significant increase of approximately 10% in the cross-sectional area of each hair. Additionally, CNPDA-thickened hairs also demonstrate altered mechanical properties of thicker fibres; increased suppleness/pliability, and increased ability to withstand force without breaking.

== See also ==
- Anagen effluvium
- Noncicatricial alopecia
