= Alopecia totalis =

Loss of all hair on the head and face

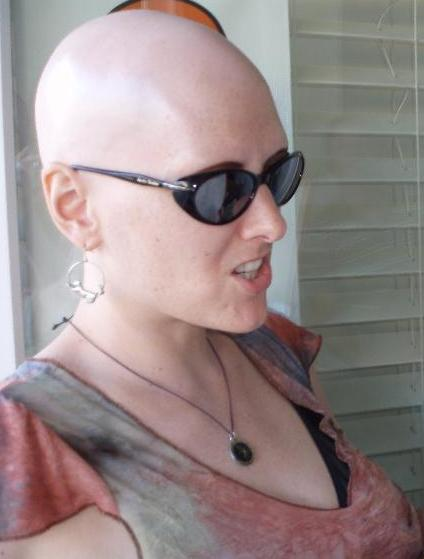
- A woman with alopecia totalis
- Specialty: Dermatology

Alopecia totalis is the loss of all hair on the head and face. Its causes are unclear, but it is believed to be an autoimmune disorder. Research suggests there may be a genetic link: the presence of DRB1*0401 and DQB1*0301, both of which are human leukocyte antigens (HLA), have been found to be associated with long-standing alopecia totalis.

== Treatment ==
Methotrexate and corticosteroids are proposed treatments.

Scalp cooling has specifically been used to prevent alopecia in docetaxel chemotherapy, although it has been found prophylactic in other regimens as well. Treatment effects may take time to resolve, with one study showing breast cancer survivors wearing wigs up to 2 years after chemotherapy.

== See also ==
- Alopecia areata
- Alopecia universalis
