= Keratosis pilaris atrophicans =

- Specialty: Dermatology
- Types: Keratosis pilaris atrophicans faciei, atrophoderma vermiculatum, and keratosis follicularis spinulosa decalvans.

Keratosis pilaris atropicans is a group of idiopathic genodermatoses that consists of three unique clinical entities: atrophoderma vermiculatum, keratosis follicularis spinulosa decalvans, and keratosis pilaris atrophicans faciei.

== Signs and symptoms ==
Keratosis pilaris atrophicans faciei manifests as follicular, horny papules encircled by an erythematous halo encompassing the chin, cheeks, forehead, and eyebrows. Gradual hair loss occurs on the lateral edges of the eyebrows after this.

Atrophoderma vermiculatum is characterized by the formation of keratotic, inflammatory papules on the face that atrophicate, leave behind pitted scars that resemble honeycombs or reticula.

Follic hyperkeratosis and scarring alopecia are keratosis follicularis spinulosa decalvans clinical hallmarks. Early childhood or infancy is when follicular hyperkeratosis first appears on the face, affecting the nose, forehead, cheeks, and eyebrows. Alopecia areata that leaves scars on the scalp and eyebrows starts in early childhood and gets worse. Additional related features include excessive periungal cuticles, corneal dystrophy with photophobia, and palmoplantar keratoderma.

== Causes ==
The aberrant keratinization of the follicular infundibulum causes keratosis pilaris atrophicans, which is characterized by irritation and blockage of the growing hair shaft. Alopecia, fibrosis, atrophy, and shrinking of the hair bulb are caused by persistent inflammation. The possibility that the genes controlling follicular keratinization are located on chromosome 18p is suggested by the association with a number of congenital disorders caused by partial monosomy or deletion in chromosomal arm 18p.

It has been demonstrated that a mutation in the desmoglein 4 gene causes autosomal recessive keratosis pilaris atrophicans.

== Diagnosis ==
Keratosis pilaris atrophicans can be diagnosed clinically. Usually, a skin biopsy is not required to make the diagnosis. When carried out, it exhibits general characteristics such as modest perifollicular inflammatory infiltration and keratotic plugs in the pilosebaceous units.

== Treatment ==
For keratosis pilaris atrophicans, there are no proven treatment options. With age, the condition frequently becomes better. It is advised to use ultraviolet (UV) protection because the condition is frequently made worse by light.

== See also ==
- Cicatricial alopecia
- List of cutaneous conditions
