= Tufted folliculitis =

- Specialty: Dermatology

Tufted folliculitis presents with doll's hair-like bundling of follicular units, and is seen in a wide range of scarring conditions including chronic staphylococcal infection, chronic lupus erythematosus, lichen planopilaris, Graham-Little syndrome, folliculitis decalvans, acne keloidalis nuchae, immunobullous disorders, and dissecting cellulitis.

== Signs and symptoms ==
Patients with tufted hair folliculitis report pain, scalp puffiness, and/or itching along with gradually increasing hair loss. Moreover, reports of perifollicular crusting and scaling are common. Clusters of anagen hairs arising from the scalp in the "doll's hair" pattern are the most common clinical feature in tufted hair folliculitis. Tenderness, edema, erythema, and/or bogginess of the scalp may be present, dependent on the length of the disease and the underlying reason for the tufting.

== Causes ==
Most of the time, the cause of tufted hair folliculitis is not known. This clinical feature is seen in relation to various forms of scarring alopecia. This observation probably refers to the final stage of follicular damage, which can be brought on by a variety of factors. Scars from burns, trauma, or surgery, keloidalis nuchae acne, folliculitis decalvans, tinea capitis, dissecting cellulitis of the scalp, lichen planus, and pemphigus vulgaris have all been linked to this pattern of hair loss. There have also been reports of drug-induced tufted hair folliculitis associated with the use of cyclosporin, trastuzumab, and lapatinib.

== Diagnosis ==
Trichoscopic analysis of the hair and scalp in regions affected by tuft hair folliculitis reveals hair tufts growing out of individual follicles. The surrounding white coloration and scaling around the hair follicles form a "starburst pattern" that is indicative of the fibrosis process. There are visible blood vessels in between the hair follicles.

== Treatment ==
There is no effective treatment for tufted hair folliculitis, and the condition's management is not codified. Treatment for tufted hair folliculitis targets the underlying illness if a cause can be found. If not, treatment should focus on reducing pain and enhancing looks.

== See also ==
- Cicatricial alopecia
- List of cutaneous conditions
