= Xavier Arnozan =

French physician (1852–1928)

Professor Xavier Arnozan
- Charles Louis Xavier Arnozan
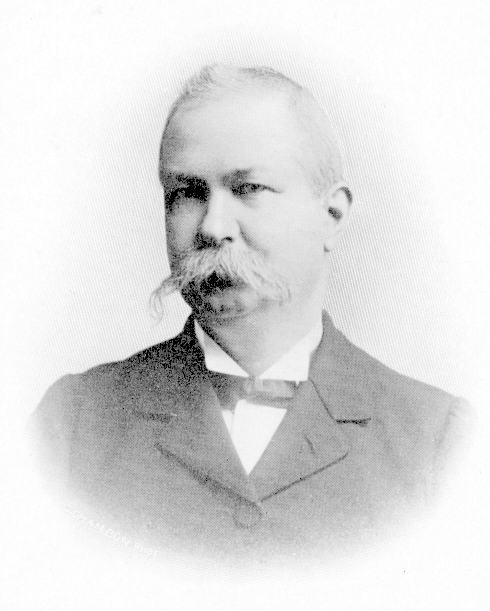
- Professor Arnozan, photography by Chambon (Deschiens edition), in the BIU Santé "collection of portraits".
- Born: 12 November 1852; Bordeaux, Gironde, France
- Died: 5 February 1928 (aged 75); Bordeaux, Gironde, France
- Education: Faculté de médecine de Paris
- Occupation: Professor of Medicine
- Years active: 1875–1925
- Employer: Faculté de médecine de Bordeaux
- Known for: Arnozan syndrome
- Parents: Alfred Arnozan (father); Clémence Giard (mother)

Charles Louis Xavier Arnozan (12 November 1852 – 5 February 1928) was a French physician, professor of therapeutics then of medical clinic at the Faculty of Medicine of Bordeaux, member of the Académie Nationale de Médecine, deputy mayor of Bordeaux in charge of hygiene.

== Biography ==
He was born in Bordeaux, from an old family of merchants, son of Clémence Giard and the pharmacist Alfred Arnozan (1815-1888) and grandson of the delivering surgeon Amand Arnozan (1779-1861). After high school, he studied medicine at the Faculty of Bordeaux where his teachers were Maurice Denucé and Paul-Louis Lande. In Paris, in 1879, he defended his medical thesis entitled "Experimental study of the mechanical acts of vomiting", which earned him a bronze medal. He became an agrégé in 1880.

He described folliculitis decalvans, a scalp disease sometimes referred to as “Arnozan syndrome” or “Quinquaud’s disease”.

With Louis Vaillard (1850–1935), he showed that duct of Wirsung ligation causes atrophy of the pancreas but not diabetes in contradiction with the works of Joseph von Mering (1849–1908) and Oscar Minkowski.

During the First World War, he was head doctor of two military hospitals 1bis and 28 in Bordeaux from 25 August 1914 to 10 January 1919. He was named to the division order by General Quinquandon, commander of the 18th region, on 20 November 1917.

He was deputy mayor of Bordeaux (Fernand Philippart mayor) from 1912 to 1925, in charge of the management of the municipal services of Assistance and Hygiene. From this position, as well as that of vice-president of the Anti-Tuberculosis Federation of the Gironde, he endowed the city with a strong hygiene policy. Thus, he created several anti-tuberculosis and anti-venereal dispensaries and was also a member of the administrative commission of the Hospices civils de Bordeaux.

He was elected National Correspondent of the Academy of Medicine for the Division of Anatomy and Physiology on 11 February 1913 and National Associate on 23 June 1925.

He was the director of the Journal de médecine de Bordeaux and died in Bordeaux on 5 February 1928.

== Works ==
- Étude expérimentale sur les actes mécaniques du vomissement, V.-A. Delahaye et Cie (Paris), 1879, 1 vol., 114 p., available at Gallica.
- Lésions consécutives aux maladies du système nerveux, Parent (Paris), 1880 - 255 p.
- « Névrome plexiforme », in J. Med. Bordeaux, 1885, vol. 15, p. 72-78.
- Des Rapports de la dermatologie avec les diverses branches de la médecine, impr. de G. Gounouilhou (Bordeaux), 1889.
- Recueil d'observations dermatologiques. Sclérodermie, névromes plexiformes, lupus verruqueux, acné hypertrophique, xeroderma pigmentosum, impr. de G. Gounouilhou (Bordeaux), 1892.
- Revue statistique des affections cutanées observées à la clinique annexe de la Faculté de Bordeaux (1889-1892), Féret et fils (Bordeaux), 1893.
- Soignons-nous les malades mieux qu'autrefois ?, impr. de G. Gounouilhou (Bordeaux), 1893, available at Gallica.
- « Folliculites dépilantes des parties glabres », in Bull. Soc. Fr. Dermatol. Syph., 1897, vol. 3, p. 187.
- Précis de thérapeutique, Octave Doin (Paris), 1900.
- « La Question des infirmières », in Journal de médecine de Bordeaux, (15 novembre 1903), p. 741-42.
- « L'Alcool et le vin devant la médecine », Extrait des Comptes rendus du Congrès des Sociétés savantes en 1903 Impr. nationale (Paris), 1904.
- Les Résultats de la prophylaxie antituberculeuse à Arcachon, [rapport 2e Congrès français de climatothérapie et d'hygiène urbaine, Arcachon, 24-28 avril 1905], éditions de la Revue des idées, 1905.
- Les Réformes dans l'organisation des études médicales, [rapport présenté à l'assemblée de la Faculté de médecine de Bordeaux et adopté par elle le 21 décembre 1905], impr. de G. Gounouilhou (Bordeaux), 1906 - 24 p.
- « Les troubles de la Faculté de médecine de Paris », in Journal de médecine de Bordeaux, 1908, p. 82, Texte intégral.
- Précis de consultations médicales, O. Doin et fils (Paris), 1910 - 478 p.
- Les régimes diurétiques, 1911 - 36 p.
- « Chronique médicale bordelaise. Transformation nécessaire », in Journal de médecine de Bordeaux, 1912, 52. p. 834,

In Collaboration

- Dictionnaire encyclopédique des sciences médicales. Masson (Paris) 1874-1889. Dechambre, Amédée (1812-1886) Directeur de publication available at Gallica
- with MM. Routier: De la Cautérisation linéaire des paupières contre le blépharospasme et l'entropion, Extrait du journal La France médicale du 6 et 10 mars 1878, V.-A. Delahaye (Paris), 1878, available at Gallica.
- with the Dr E. Régis: Un Cas de crétinisme sporadique avec pseudo-lipomes symétriques susclaviculaires, impr. de Gounouilhou (Bordeaux), 1888.
- with Louis Vaillard: « Contribution a l'Étude du Pancréas du Lapin. Lésions provoquées par la ligature du canal de Wirsung », in Arch Physiol Norm Pathol, 3 (1884): 287-316.
- with the Drs L. Lande et Gabriel Maurange: Deux Cas d'anthrax guéri par les injections sous-cutanées d'acide phénique, impr. de G. Gounouilhou (Bordeaux), 1889, available at Gallica.
- with Dr Jacques Carles: Quelques Remarques nouvelles sur les abcès de fixation, Extrait de La Province médicale (23 décembre 1905), 1906, available at Gallica.
- with H. Lamarque: Précis d'hydrologie médicale, O. Doin (Paris), 1913 - 696 p.
- with L. Lenoir: « Vitiligo avec troubles nerveux sensitifs et sympathiques: l’origine sympathique du vitiligo », in Bull Soc Fr Dermatol Syphil, 1922, vol. 12, p. 124-140.

Preface

- Albert Fraikin: Études radio-cliniques sur l'appareil digestif. Déséquilibre du ventre et appendicite chronique, Norbert Maloine, 1928.

== Distinctions ==
- Commandeur of the Legion of Honour the 8 February 1927.
- Officer of the Order of St. Sava.
- Officer of the Ordre des Palmes académiques

== Legacy ==
- A hospital located in Pessac, part of the Bordeaux University Hospital (South Hospital Group), bears his name. 44.79743°N 0.65769°W
- The “Cours Xavier Arnozan” (ex. Pavé des Chartrons) in Bordeaux was named after him. 44.84923°N 0.57274°W

== Bibliography ==
- « Xavier Arnozan », in: Larousse mensuel illustré : revue encyclopédique universelle, Edited by Claude Augé, Larousse (Paris), 1907-1957, available at Gallica.
- Pierre Mauriac: « Nécrologie. Le professeur X. Arnozan », in: Paris médical : la semaine du clinicien, 1928, n°68, p. 223-4, Full text.
- Les illustres de Bordeaux (in French). Vol. 1. Bordeaux: Dossiers d'Aquitaine. 2013. ISBN 978-2-84622-232-7.
- Vincent, Jean-François. "Arnozan, Charles Louis Xavier". biusante.parisdescartes.fr (in French). Paris: Université de Paris.
- Exposé des titres et travaux scientifiques du Dr X. Arnozan candidat à la chaire de thérapeutique de la Faculté de médecine de Bordeaux, Impr. G. Gounouilhou (Bordeaux), 1892, Full text.
