= Giant cell lichenoid dermatitis =

- Specialty: Dermatology

Giant cell lichenoid dermatitis is a cutaneous condition usually drug-associated entity, characterized by a lichenoid dermatitis with a granulomatous infiltrate composed of histiocytes and multinucleated giant cells.

== See also ==
- Lichenoid dermatitis
- List of cutaneous conditions
