= Idiopathic eruptive macular pigmentation =

- Specialty: Dermatology

Idiopathic eruptive macular pigmentation is a skin condition developing in young persons, with an average age of 11, characterized by asymptomatic widespread brown to gray macules of up to several centimeters in diameter on the neck, trunk, and proximal extremities.

== See also ==
- Lichen planus
- Skin lesion
