= Pressure alopecia =

- Other names: Postoperative alopecia, pressure-induced alopecia.
- Specialty: Dermatology

Pressure alopecia, also known as postoperative alopecia, and pressure-induced alopecia, occurs in adults after prolonged pressure on the scalp during general anesthesia, with the head fixed in one position, and may also occur in chronically ill persons after prolonged bed rest in one position that causes persistent pressure on one part of the scalp, all likely due to pressure-induced ischemia.

Pressure alopecia usually manifests as a skin-colored hairless patch on the occiput. Hair loss usually becomes noticeable 3-28 days after the initial trigger. Depending on the severity of ischemia pressure alopecia can be scarring or non-scarring.

Pressure alopecia is diagnosed based on clinical history and the symptoms. Treatment is usually not needed because the condition spontaneously resolves within months.

== Signs and symptoms ==
Pressure alopecia typically affects the occiput and manifests as a distinct area that is bald and skin-colored. Other symptoms include swelling, erythema and tenderness.

Hair regeneration takes place between one and four months following the triggering incident, with hair loss often becoming apparent three to 28 days later. A patient may experience nonscarring or scarring alopecia, depending on the severity of pressure-induced tissue ischemia. Alopecia that is not scarred is the outcome of milder ischemia, while alopecia that is scarred is the consequence of persistent ischemia that causes ulcer formation.

== Causes ==
This condition's primary cause is pressure-induced skin capillary blood flow restriction, which causes ischemia and localized hypoxemia in compressed hair follicles.

Risk factors for developing pressure alopecia include extended surgeries, obesity, mental health issues, acidosis, intraoperative hypoperfusion, Trendelenburg posture, and performance status.

Pressure alopecia has been documented following protracted critical care unit (ICU) stays and surgical procedures. Cervical collar use, orthodontic headgear, and electroencephalogram (EEG) electrode application have all been associated with reports of pressure alopecia.

== Diagnosis ==
Clinical criteria such as the development of alopecia in the occiput and ulceration or scarring, along with a usual history of protracted surgery or immobility, are used to diagnose pressure alopecia.

== Treatment ==
Because the condition is typically self-limited and reversible, treatment is not usually required.

== Outlook ==
Pressure alopecia is usually reversible, with hair growing back in a few months.

== See also ==
- Cicatricial alopecia
- List of cutaneous conditions
