= Nestor Gréhant =

French physiologist

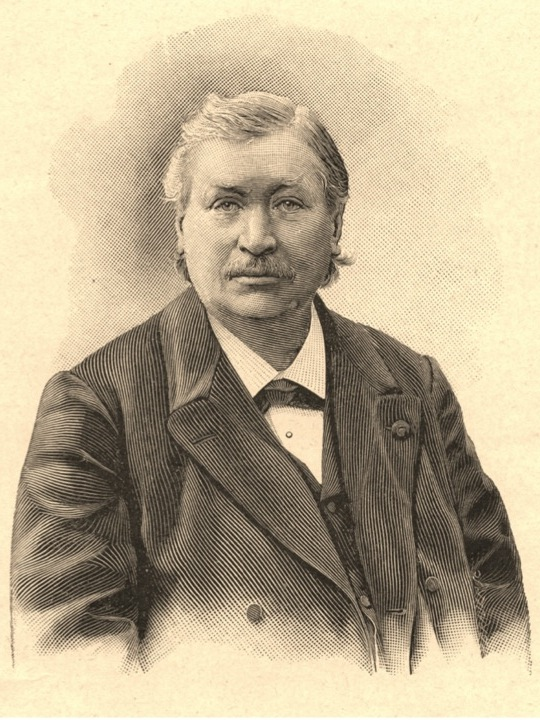
- Born: 2 April 1838; Laon, France
- Died: 26 March 1910 (aged 71)
- Citizenship: France
- Scientific career
- Fields: Physiology
- Thesis: Recherches physiologiques, 1 sur l'excrétion de l'urée par les reins, 2 sur la respiration des poissons (1870)

Nestor Louis François Gréhant (2 April 1838 in Laon – 26 March 1910) was a French physiologist.

In 1864 he received his medical doctorate in Paris, where he later earned a doctorate in natural sciences (1870). He served as a préparateur to Claude Bernard at the faculty of sciences in Paris, and subsequently became director of the laboratory of general physiology at the École pratique des Hautes Études. In Paris, he also served as a professor of physiology at the Muséum d’Histoire Naturelle. In 1905 he became a member of the Académie de médecine.

He is best remembered for his studies of blood and blood circulation (measurement of cardiac output in animals) and respiration. He also made contributions in his research of the nervous system, of muscle activity, toxicology, anaesthesia and experimental hygiene. He developed a number of devices that he used in research, including a grisoumètre (firedamp detector) that was still in use in coal mines up until 1950.

== Selected works ==
- Recherches physiques sur la respiration de l'homme, 1864 – Physical research on respiration in humans.
- Manuel de physique médicale, 1869 – Manual of medical physiology.
- Absorption de l'oxyde de carbone par l'organisme vivant, 1879 – Absorption of carbon monoxide by the living organism.
- Recherches sur la respiration et sur la fermentation de la levure de grains (with Charles-Eugène Quinquaud) – Research on respiration and fermentation of grains of yeast.
- Les poisons de l'air, l'acide carbonique et l'oxyde de carbone, 1890 – Poisons of the air, carbon dioxide and carbon monoxide.
- Les gaz du sang, 1894 – Blood gases.
- Sur l'emploi du grisoumètre dans les recherches physiologiques, 1894 – On the use of a methanometer in physiological research.
- Oxyde de carbone, alcool éthylique et grisou, 1903 – Carbon monoxide, ethyl alcohol and firedamp.
- Hygiène expérimentale: l'oxyde de carbone, 1903 – Experimental hygiene; carbon monoxide.
- Mesure de l'activité physiologique des reins par le dosage de l'urée dans le sang et dans l'urine, 1904 – Measurement of the physiological activity of the kidneys by the determination of urea in the blood and urine.
- Rapport sur l'ankylostomiase, le grisou, l'oxyde de carbone, 1909 – Report on hookworm, mine gases, carbon monoxide.
