= Wickham striae =

Medical symptom

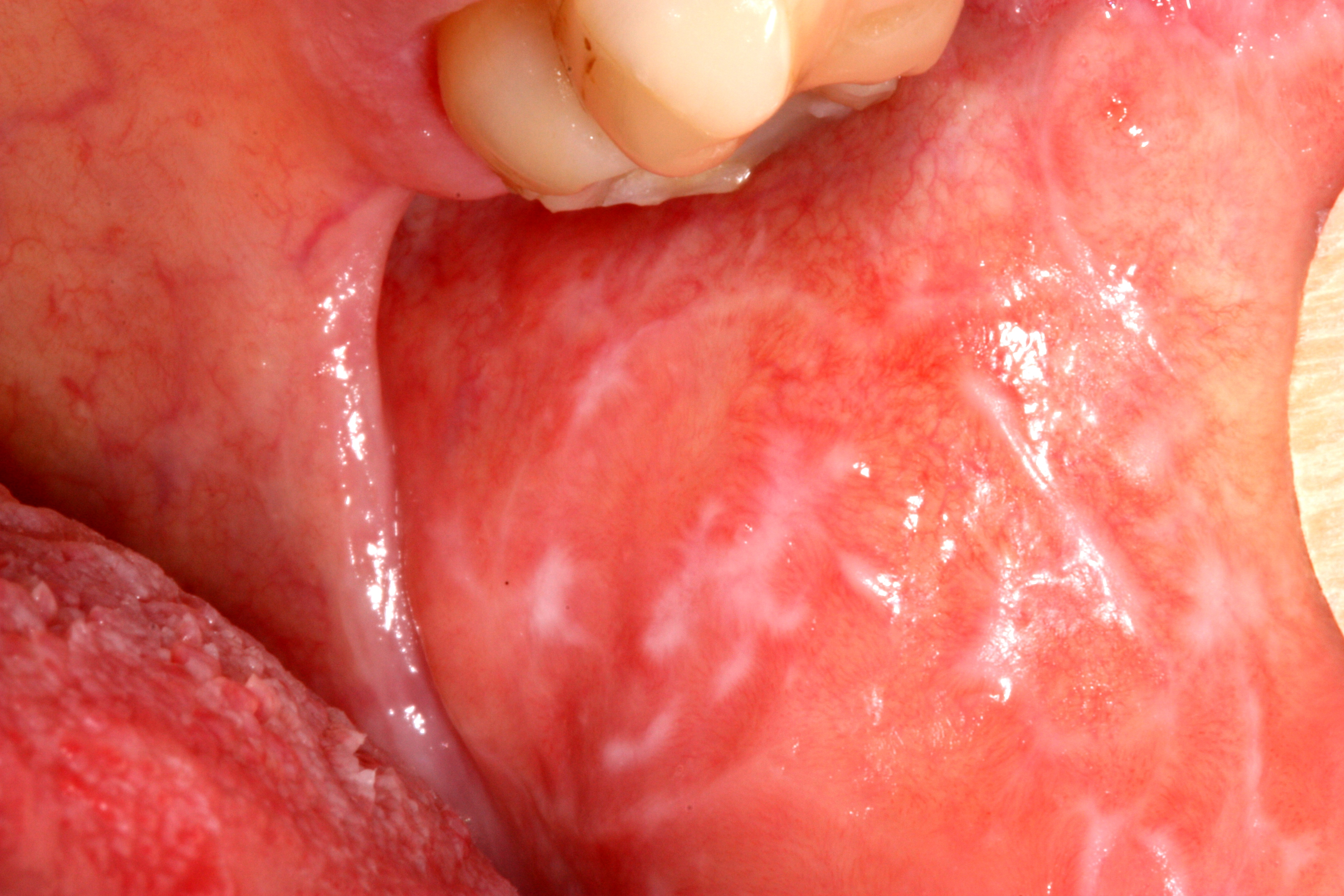

Wickham striae or Wickham's striae are whitish lines visible in the papules of lichen planus and other dermatoses, typically in the oral mucosa. The microscopic appearance shows hypergranulosis. They are named after Louis Frédéric Wickham.
