= Atrophodermia vermiculata =

Dermatological condition

- Other names: Acne vermoulante, Acne vermoulanti, Atrophoderma reticulata symmetrica faciei, Atrophoderma reticulatum, Atrophoderma vermiculata, Atrophoderma vermiculatum, Atrophodermia reticulata symmetrica faciei, Atrophodermia ulerythematosa, Atrophodermie vermiculée des joues avec kératoses folliculaires, Folliculitis ulerythema reticulata, Folliculitis ulerythematous reticulata, Folliculitis ulerythemosa, Honeycomb atrophy, Ulerythema acneforme and Ulerythema acneiforme
- Specialty: Dermatology

Atrophodermia vermiculata presents with erythematous follicular papules on the cheeks in childhood and, with time, the lesions develop into pit-like depressions.

== See also ==
- Skin lesion
- Cicatricial alopecia
- Ulerythema
- List of cutaneous conditions
