= Louis Frédéric Wickham =

French physician and pathologist

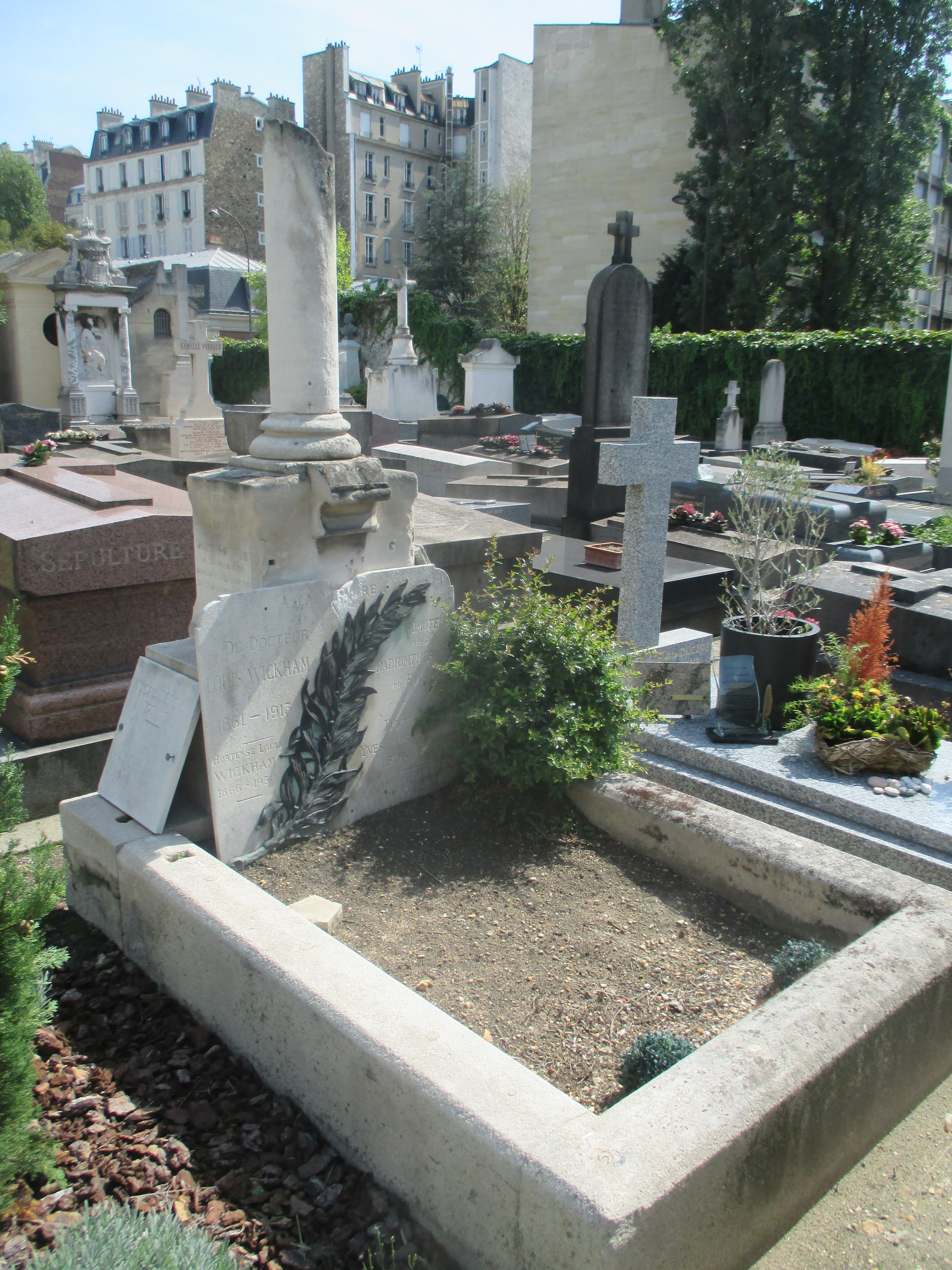
Louis Wickham's grave in Neuilly-sur-Seine community cemetery

Louis Frédéric Wickham (28 February 1861 in Paris – 14 October 1913 in Mesnil-le-Roi) was a French physician and pathologist remembered for describing Wickham striae. He trained in medicine in Paris, receiving his M.D. in 1890. He studied dermatology at the Hôpital Saint-Louis in Paris before becoming physician at the Hôpital Saint-Lazare in 1897. After 1905 he worked on research into radium.
