= Ophiasis =

- Specialty: Dermatology

Ophiasis is a form of alopecia areata characterized by the loss of hair in the shape of a wave at the circumference of the head.

It gets its name from Greek ὄφις ophis 'snake' because of the apparent similarity to a snake-shape and the pattern of hair loss.

The term "sisaipho" is used to characterize the inverse pattern. Sisaipho is, almost, the reverse spelling of ophiasis. It is also called "ophiasis inversus".

This form of hair loss "...targets the body's own hair follicles, resulting in hair loss..." and although the immune system could be attacking hair follicle melanocytes, dermal papilla cells, and keratinocytes,” the foundational cause of this disease is yet to be confirmed.

== Pattern of hair loss ==
This is one among many types of patterns of hair loss, “in which they have band-link hair loss across the occiput.” Hair loss can take the form of patches of hair being removed and there can also be spontaneous regrowth as well.

== Duration of hair loss ==
Ophiasis hair loss is one form in which the hair loss can further deteriorate and can extend “for more than a year.”
