= Graham-Little syndrome =

- Other names: Graham Little-Piccardi-Lassueur syndrome
- Specialty: Dermatology

Graham-Little syndrome or Graham-Little–Piccardi–Lassueur syndrome is a cutaneous condition characterized by lichen planus–like skin lesions. It is named after Ernest Graham-Little.

== Signs and symptoms ==
Graham-Little syndrome is defined by a follicular spinous papule on the body, scalp, or both, noncicatricial alopecia of the axilla and groin, and patchy cicatricial alopecia of the scalp.

== Causes ==
Although the precise cause of the condition is unknown, as it is thought to be a variation of lichen planus, cell-mediated immunity—a type of immune system—may be a crucial factor in the development of the disease's clinical manifestation. There have only been a few reported isolated cases of androgen insensitivity syndrome (testicular feminization), which has a familial pattern, a link with hepatitis B vaccination, and phenotypically feminine (genetically XY) patients.

== Diagnosis ==
According to histopathology, early lesions of lichen planopilaris exhibit vacuolar alterations in the outer root sheath as well as perifollicular lymphocytic infiltrates at the level of the isthmus and infundibulum. In more advanced cases, there is epithelial atrophy and perifollicular fibrosis at the level of the isthmus and infundibulum, which results in the distinctive hourglass shape. In more advanced cases, the lost hair follicles are replaced with elastic fibers arranged vertically in place of the lost hair follicles.

== Treatment ==
PUVA therapy, cyclosporine, retinoids, topical, intralesional, and systemic corticosteroids, and antimalarials are among the treatment techniques that have been tested.

== Epidemiology ==
Graham-Little syndrome occurs in people between the ages of 30 and 70, with four times as many reports of females experiencing it as males.

== See also ==
- List of cutaneous conditions
