= Trachonychia =

Nail condition involving linear ridges

Trachyonychia
- Other names: Sandpapered nails, Twenty nail dystrophy
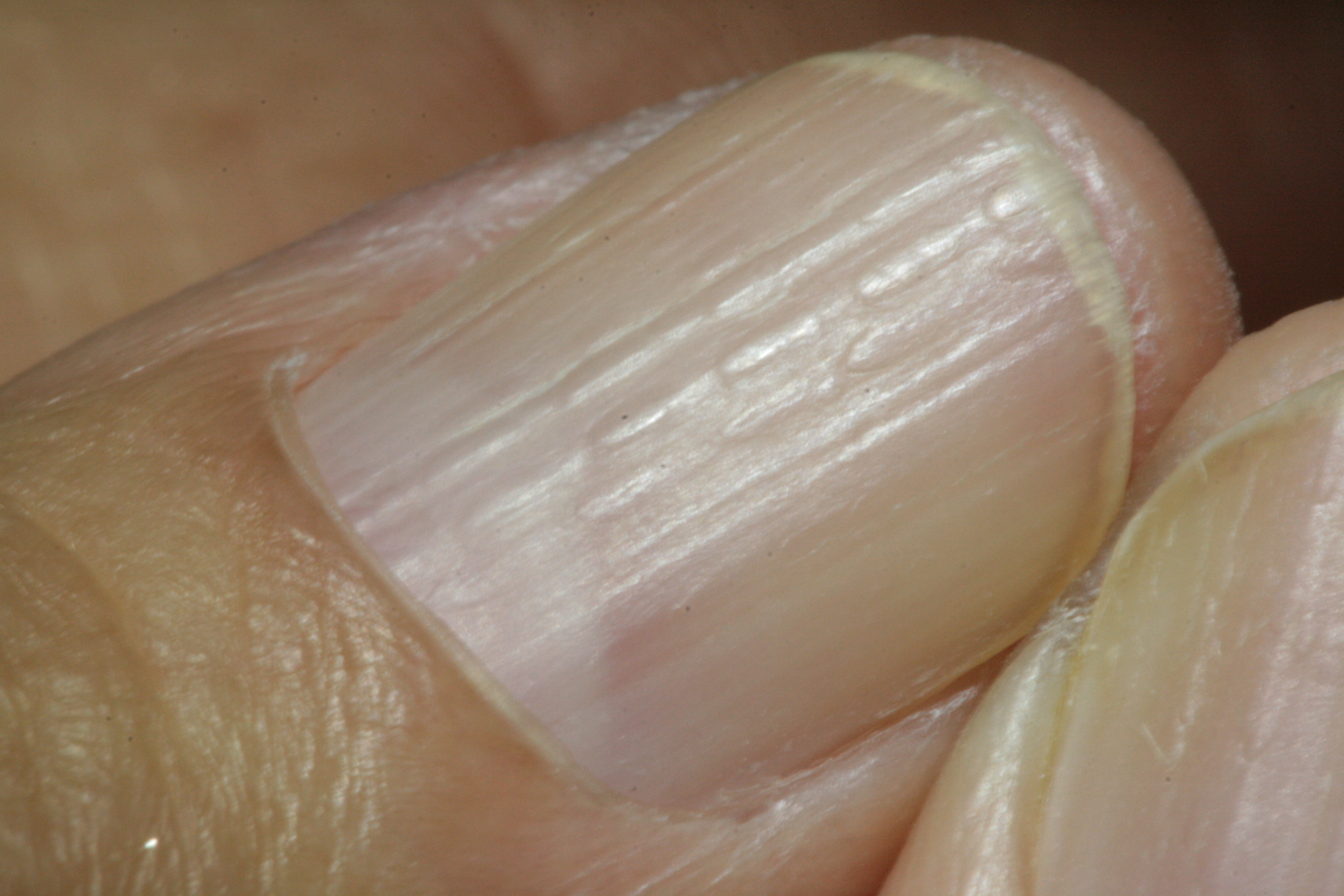
- Specialty: Dermatology
- Causes: Lichen planus

Trachyonychia is a condition characterized by rough accentuated linear ridges (longitudinal striations) on the nails of the fingers and toes. The term is from Greek τραχύς (trakhus) 'rough' and ὄνυξ (onyx) 'nail'. When the condition occurs on all the twenty nails of the fingers and toes, it is known as twenty-nail dystrophy, most evident in childhood, favoring males.

Trachyonychia causes the nails to become opalescent, thin, dull, fragile, and finely longitudinally ridged, and, as a result, distally notched. It can be a manifestation of lichen planus, psoriasis, alopecia areata, immunoglobulin A deficiency, atopic dermatitis, and ichthyosis vulgaris.

"The longitudinal striations can occur as a normal part of the aging process", and not until the nails start to thin and get a sandpaper look is the condition called trachonychia. The nails are opalescent and frequently are brittle and split at the free margin. There has been evidence of the condition as a cutaneous manifestation of lichen planus. It has also been associated with other diseases such as eczema, psoriasis, alopecia areata, and atopic dermatitis. Trachonychia is often seen in vitiligo patients, suggesting that they are more susceptible to this condition.
