= Ulerythema =

- Specialty: Dermatology

Ulerythema means "scar plus redness," and refers to several different cutaneous conditions, including atrophoderma vermiculatum and keratosis pilaris atrophicans faciei.

== See also ==
- Genodermatoses
