= Anna Quinquaud =

French explorer and sculptor

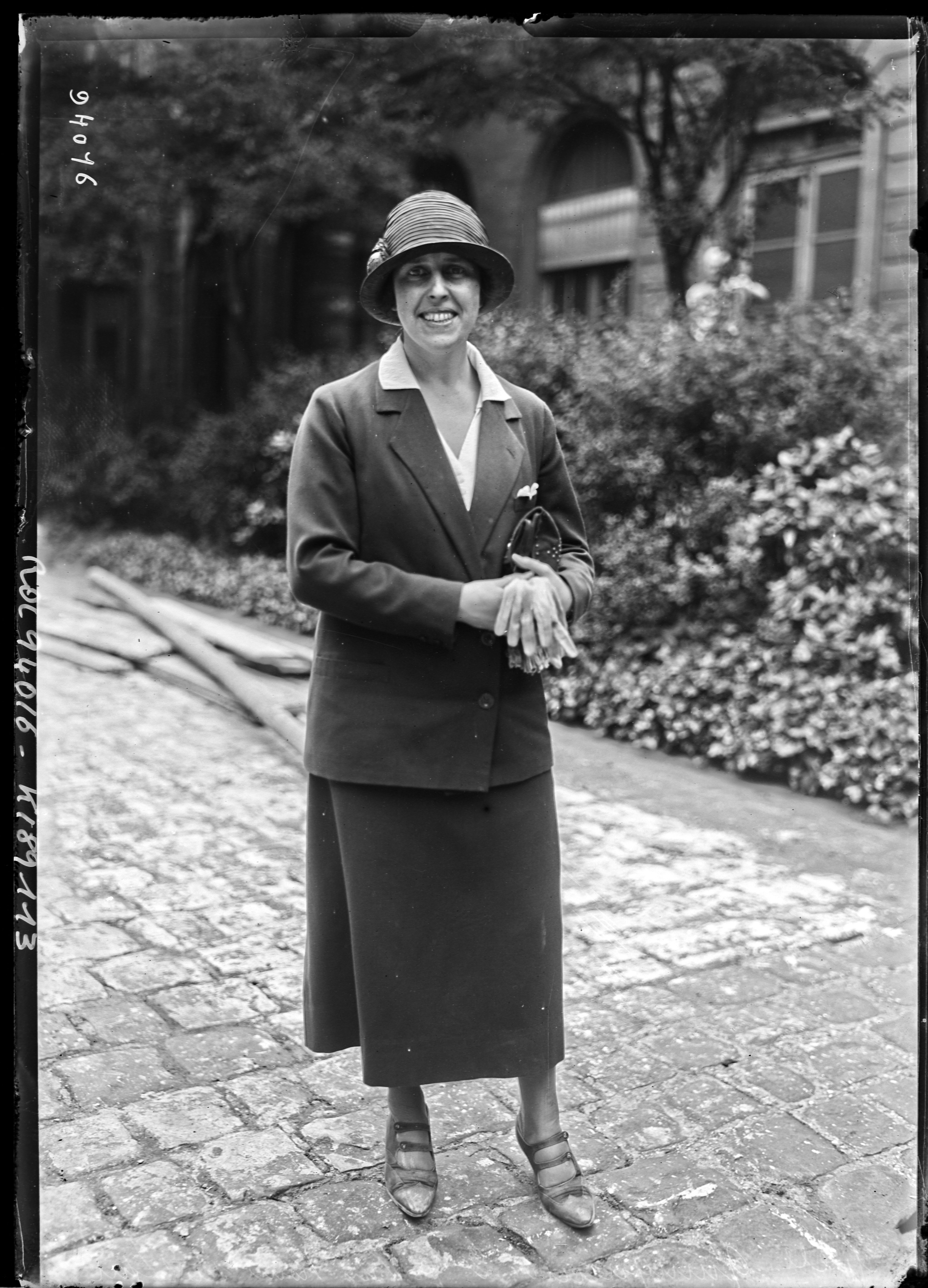
- Press photo for the Prix de Rome in sculpture, 1924
- Born: Anna Fanny Marguerite Quinquaud; March 5, 1890; Paris, France
- Died: December 25, 1984 (aged 94); Fontenay-Trésigny, France
- Education: École des Beaux-Arts
- Known for: Sculpture, exploration
- Awards: Chevalier of the Légion d'honneur Prix de Rome second prize
- Elected: Académie des sciences d'outre-mer

Anna Fanny Marguerite Quinquaud (1890–1984) was a French explorer and award-winning sculptor. From 1925, she travelled to the French-speaking countries of East Africa where she created numerous sculptures and water colours inspired by her impressions of the local people. She exhibited them at the Galerie Charpentier and at the Paris Colonial Exposition in 1931. In 1932, she visited Ethiopia where she created a bust of Haile Selassie.

Her work is included in the collection of the musée Despiau-Wlérick in Mont-de-Marsan, France.

== Early life and education ==
Born on 5 March 1890 in Paris, Anna Fanny Marguerite Quinquaud was the fourth of six children of the sculptor Thérèse Caillaux (1859–1928), who introduced her to the art of sculpting and a dermatologist Charles-Eugène Quinquaud (1841–1894). Following the death of her father, she spent her summers on the family's property at Lafat in the Creuse where her mother had a studio. It was at Lafat when only 12 years old that she created a terracotta relief titled "La Bergère et ses moutons". When she was 17, she was commissioned to create a bust of the politician Armand Fourot for Évaux-les-Bains. Quinquaud received further instruction under Blanche Laurent before being admitted to the École des Beaux-Arts in 1918 where she studied under Laurent Marqueste and Victor Ségoffin.

== Career ==
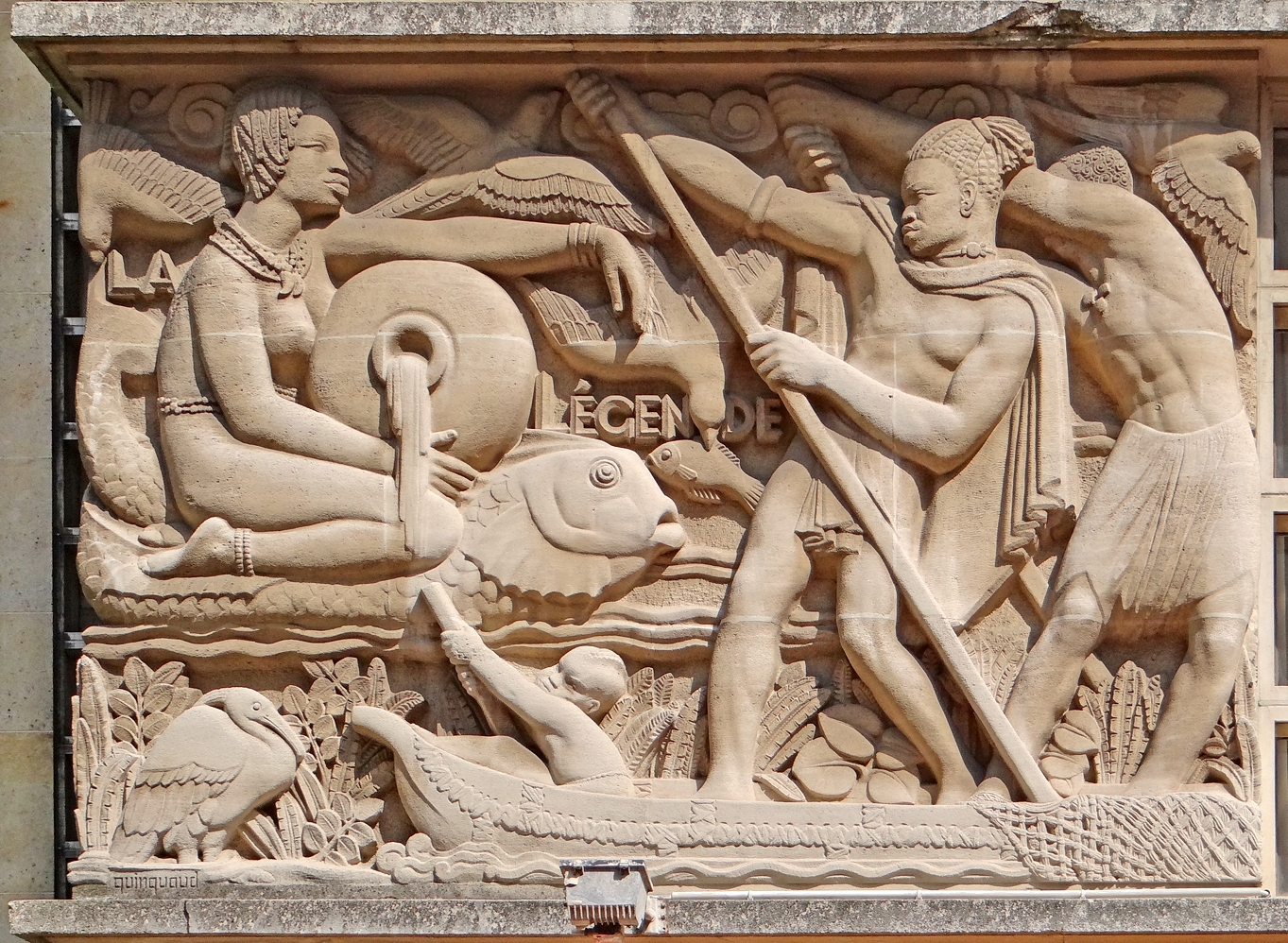
Relief by Quinquaud at the Résidence Lucien Paye

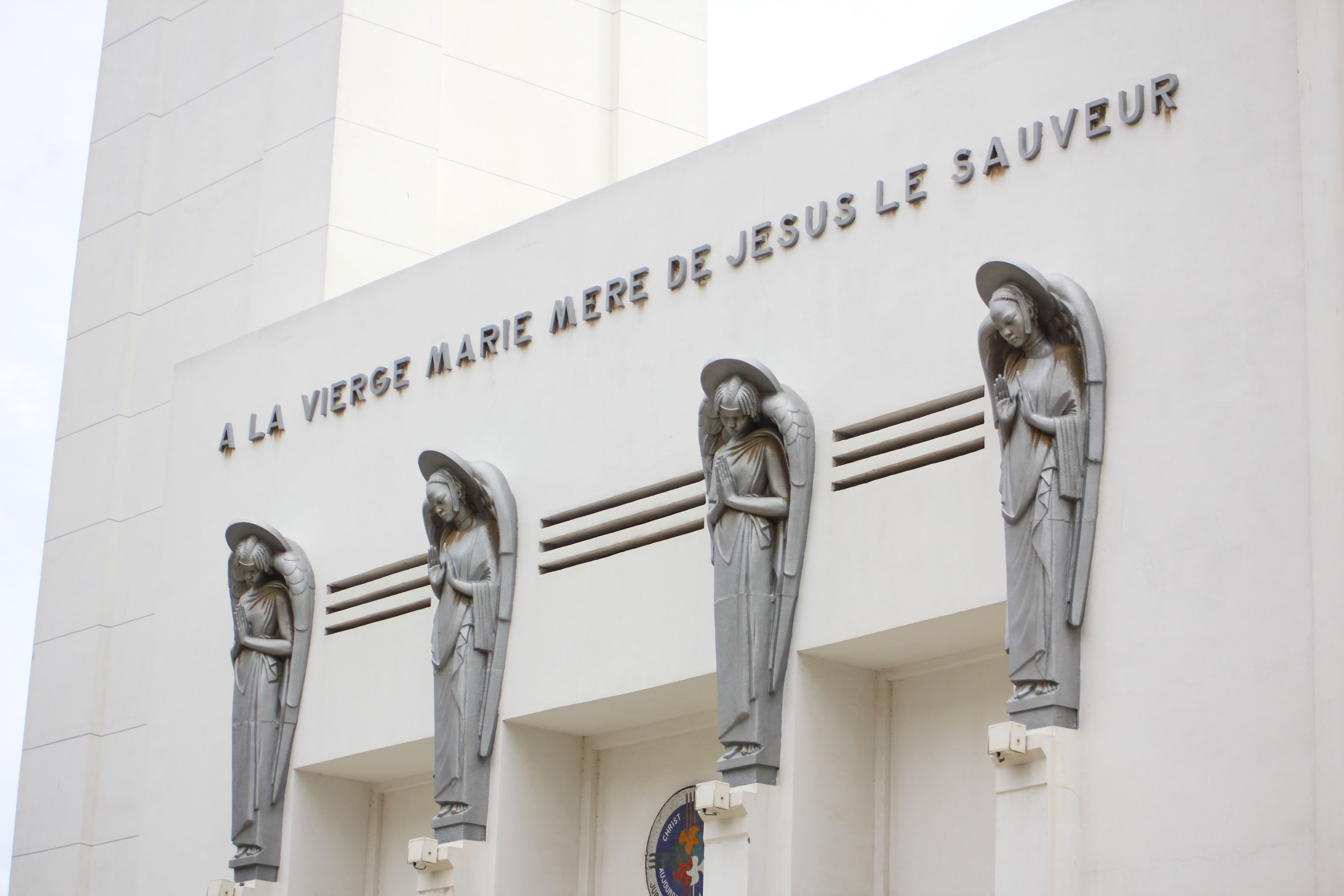
Quinquaud's Caryatid Angels (1936), Our Lady of Victories Cathedral, Dakar

In 1924, the École des Beaux-Arts awarded her a Prix de Rome scholarship, including a year's study in Rome. However quite unusually for a young woman of her day, she decided instead to travel to Africa in 1925–26, visiting the Niger, Mauritania, Senegal, Sudan and Mali, accompanied only by her Sudanese boys who carried her sculptures, clothes and equipment. Inspired by the local people, she portrayed them in her sculptures.

Thanks to her careful observation of their bodies and faces, her busts, bronzes and artwork depicted African women during pregnancy, carrying water or at work.

She subsequently returned to Africa in 1930–31, this time at her own expense, visiting the Niger, the Fouta Djallon region of French Guinea and Timbuktu. Based in Pita, over a period of eight months she came into contact with the Fula, Coniagui and Bassari people. Her creations include the tall beauty Aissatou, the rather sulky Kadé, Tougué's daughter, Nénégalley, daughter of Tierno Moktar, chief of Pita, a little Fula girl, her "Maternité Pita", holding a baby, and "Archer coniagui" complete with bow. Aspiring to capture the essence of these people, she commented: "Isn't it the artist's role to reveal to the non-initiate what he is unable to see?" Whether in wood, bronze or terracotta, her works depict the slim, haughty silhouettes of these figures, also revealing their gestures and movements. Many of her works from this expedition were exhibited at the Galerie Charpentier in Paris and at the 1931 Paris Colonial Exposition.

In 1932, she visited Africa for the third and last time, visiting Somalia, Ethiopia and Madagascar, once again bringing back her creations. These and earlier works were exhibited at the Exposition Internationale des Arts et Techniques dans la Vie Moderne in 1937.

In later life, she participated in work on several monuments in Normandy, including the Calvaire Saint-Pierre Memorial in Caen (1961) and plaster reliefs for the Jean Moulin de Venoix school (1978).

Anna Quinquaud died on 25 December 1984 at Fontenay-Trésigny.

== Awards and distinctions ==
Anna Quinquaud received many awards, including:

- 1914: Prix de sculptures décerné par l’Union des Femmes Peintres, Sculpteurs, Graveurs et Décorateurs
- 1924: Prix de Rome, second prize
- 1924: Prix de l'Afrique Occidentale Française
- 1932: Prix de Madagascar
- 1932: Chevalier of the Légion d'honneur
- 1946: Elected to the Académie des sciences d'outre-mer
- 1952: Grand prix des Arts décoratifs d'outre-mer
