= Keratosis pilaris atrophicans faciei =

- Other names: Folliculitis rubra, Keratosis pilaris rubra atrophicans faciei, Lichen pilare, Lichen pilaire ou xerodermie pilaire symetrique de la face, Ulerythema ophryogenes, and Xerodermie pilaire symetrique de la face
- Specialty: Dermatology

Keratosis pilaris atrophicans faciei begins in infancy as follicular papules with perifollicular erythema. Initially, the lesions are restricted to the lateral eyebrows, but with time spread to involve the cheeks and forehead, and may also be associated with keratosis pilaris on the extremities and buttocks.

== See also ==
- Skin lesion
- Cicatricial alopecia
- Ulerythema
- List of cutaneous conditions
