= Charles-Eugène Quinquaud =

French internist and dermatologist

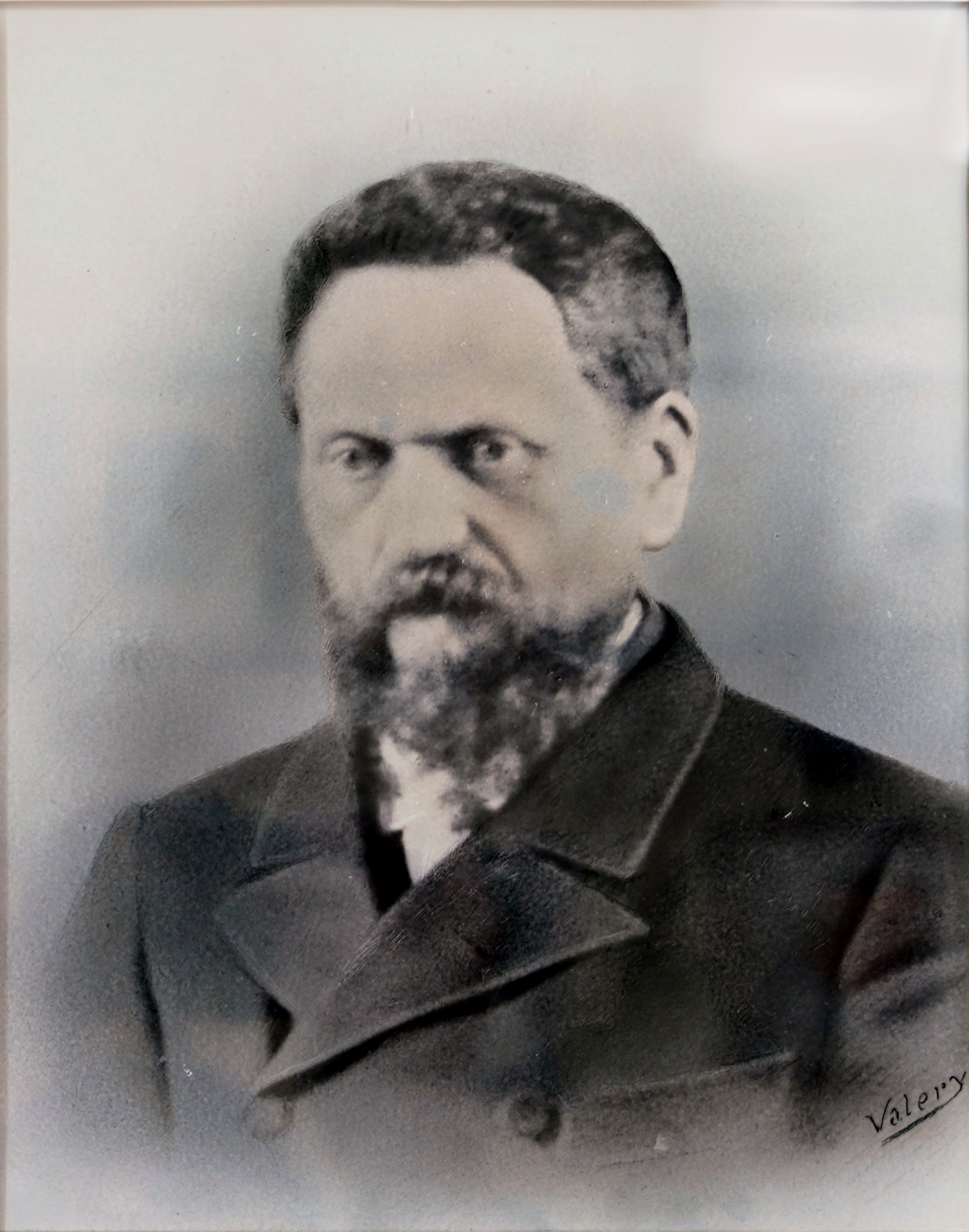
Presented at the Paris Casting Museum.

Charles-Eugène Quinquaud (26 December 1841, Lafat – 9 January 1894, Paris) was a French internist and dermatologist.

He studied medicine in Limoges and Paris, receiving his doctorate in 1873. While working as a hospital interne, he was influenced by Pierre-Antoine-Ernest Bazin to study dermatology. In 1878 he became médecin des hôpitaux, obtained his agrégation in 1883, and from 1886 served as chef de service at the Hôpital Saint-Louis in Paris. During his career, he worked closely with dermatologists Ernest Besnier, Jean Alfred Fournier and Émile Vidal. In 1892 he was elected as a member of the Académie de Médecine.

In 1888 he described folliculitis decalvans, a scalp disease sometimes referred to as "Quinquaud’s disease". His name is also associated with "Quinquaud's sign", a form of finger tremor with a sideways finger movement from the interossei. The phenomenon was first described in alcoholics, and its description was first published by a student of Quinquaud's, six years after his death.

In 1882, with physiologist Nestor Gréhant, he developed a method for determining blood volume through the use of carbon monoxide.

== Selected writings ==
- Étude sur les affections articulaires (first fascicle), 1876.
- Mesure de la quantité de sang contenu dans l'organisme d'un mammifère vivant (with Nestor Gréhant), 1882.
- Traité technique de chimie biologique, 1883.
- De la scrofule dans ses rapports avec la phtisie pulmonaire, 1883.
- Folliculite épilate décalvante. Réunions clin. Hôpital St. Louis, Comptes rendus. Paris, 1888–1889, 9: 17.
- Folliculite destructive des régions velues. Bulletins et memoires de la Société medicale des hôpitaux de Paris, 1888, 5: 95–98.
- Études de thérapeutique expérimentale et clinique, 1892.

== See also ==
- Anna Quinquaud
