= Alopecia mucinosa =

- Other names: Follicular mucinosis
- Specialty: Dermatology

Alopecia mucinosa, also known as Follicular mucinosis, Mucinosis follicularis, Pinkus' follicular mucinosis, and Pinkus' follicular mucinosis–benign primary form, is a skin disorder that generally presents, but not exclusively, as erythematous plaques or flat patches without hair primarily on the scalp, neck and face. This can also be present on the body as a follicular mucinosis and may represent a systemic disease.

Alopecia mucinosa is divided into three different variants, primary acute, primary chronic, and secondary alopecia mucinosa.

== Signs and symptoms ==
Follicle papules and alopecia are the two main clinical signs of alopecia mucinosa. There may be patches of follicular papules, plaques, and nodules. In addition to the usual erythema and scaling, active lesions might occasionally express mucous material. The most frequently involved areas are the face and the scalp.

== Causes ==
Although the precise pathophysiology is uncertain, it has been suggested that cell-mediated immunity and circulating immune complexes play a part in responding to persistent antigens like Staphylococcus aureus.

== Diagnosis ==
Alopecia mucinosa patients require many skin biopsy samples for examination. Alopecia mucinosa is characterized by follicular degeneration and a buildup of mucin inside the follicles.

=== Classification ===
The primary acute form of alopecia mucinosa is more common in children and young adults, characterized by isolated lesions on the scalp and skull that go away on their own in a short amount of time. The primary chronic variant of alopecia mucinosa is more common in slightly older age groups, has many disseminated lesions, and has a longer course with recurrent recurrences after treatment. A variety of benign and malignant illnesses can lead to secondary alopecia mucinosa.

== Treatment ==
Topical, intralesional, and systemic glucocorticoids, dapsone, x-irradiation, antimalarials, isotretinoin, indomethacin, minocycline, UVA1 phototheraphy, and PUVA photochemotheraphy, are among the treatment methods that have been documented in the therapy of this condition.

== See also ==
- List of cutaneous conditions
