= Folliculitis decalvans =

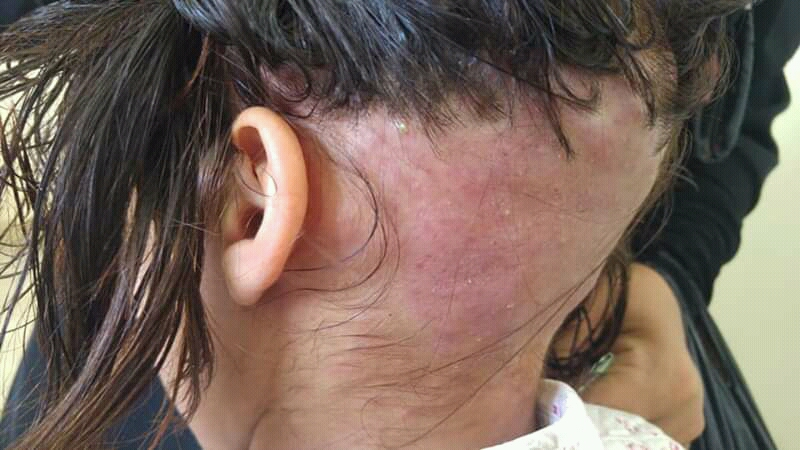
- Specialty: Dermatology

Folliculitis decalvans is an inflammation of the hair follicle that leads to bogginess or induration of involved parts of the scalp along with pustules, erosions, crusts, ulcers, and scale. It begins at a central point and spreads outward, leaving scarring, sores, and, due to the inflammation, hair loss in its wake. No permanent cure has been found for this condition, but there is promise in a regimen of dual therapy with rifampin 300 mg twice daily and clindamycin 300 mg twice daily. This treatment can be used to control the condition, and tests have indicated that after 3 to 5 months long uninterrupted courses of treatment, many patients have seen limited to no recurrence.

== Causes ==
There is no certainty about the cause of this disorder, but the bacterial species Staphylococcus aureus has a central role and can be detected in the lesions of most patients. It is unclear if another primarily sterile process with secondary colonization by Staphylococcus aureus is present, or if Staphylococcus aureus starts the process by causing a strong immune reaction. Another possibility is that Staphylococcus aureus produces toxins that act as superantigens which directly activate the T-cells over the variable domain of T-cell receptors. Nonetheless Staphylococcus aureus can by found in almost all patients affected by this disorder, while it is detected in only 20–30% of non-affected people.

As Staphylococcus aureus is not always found in people with folliculitis decalvans, other factors must be present. Through examinations in families it was found that there is a family connection to the occurrences, which leads to the conclusion that there is a genetic predisposition for it; for example, patients with folliculitis decalvans could have a hereditary different opening of the hair follicle that could facilitate the lodging of the bacteria. Immunologically, another possibility is that especially strong intercellular fixation protein ICAM-1 contributes to inflammation with its strong effect of attracting white blood cells such as granulocytes and lymphocytes.

== Management ==
While there is no cure currently for Folliculitis Decalvans, there are treatments that have brought some patients ongoing relief from painful symptoms. One study available in the 'Journal of the American Academy of Dertmatology' indicates that of 23 patients, 21 of the study subjects with biopsy-proven FD found great relief with the Biologic Humira, citing picture and documented evidence. It is not yet known the full cause of the disease, but recent findings suggest an autoimmune component. In the vast majority of patients the bacteria Staphylococcus aureus is present and has had minor success with a combination therapy of Clindamycin and Rifampin, although the rate of relief after this therapy is stopped is unknown. To date, Humira shows the best long-term therapeutic relief for patients with this painful disease that causes pustules, hair loss and excessive inflammation.

Source: https://www.jaad.org/article/S0190-9622(22)00358-9/fulltext

== Epidemiology ==
This disorder was first described by Charles-Eugène Quinquaud in 1888. He isolated bacteria from the hair follicles of affected patients and introduced them in rats, mice and rabbits, with no result. In 1905 it was then differentiated from other scarring alopecias and the name Folliculitis decalvans, that remains current, was introduced. About 11% of the occurrences of scarring alopecias are of this type. Men are more commonly affected than women and its appearance is usually between the late teens and middle adult years. According to studies in the United States, African Americans are more frequently affected than White Americans.

== See also ==
- Cicatricial alopecia
