= Lichen planus =

Human chronic inflammatory disease

- Other names: LP
- Pronunciation: /ˈlaɪkən ˈpleɪnəs/ LY-kən PLAY-nəs
- Specialty: Dermatology

Lichen planus (LP) is a chronic inflammatory and immune mediated disease that affects the skin, nails, hair, and mucous membranes. It is not an actual lichen, but is named for its appearance. It is characterized by polygonal, flat-topped, violaceous papules and plaques with overlying, reticulated, fine white scale (Wickham's striae), commonly affecting dorsal hands, flexural wrists and forearms, trunk, anterior lower legs, and oral mucosa. The hue may be gray-brown in people with darker skin. Although there is a broad clinical range of LP manifestations, the skin and oral cavity remain the major sites of involvement. The cause is unknown, but it is thought to be the result of an autoimmune process with an unknown initial trigger. There is no cure, but many medications and procedures have been used in efforts to control the symptoms.

The term lichenoid reaction (lichenoid eruption or lichenoid lesion) refers to a lesion of similar or identical histopathologic and clinical appearance to lichen planus (i.e., an area which resembles lichen planus, both to the naked eye and under a microscope). Sometimes dental materials or certain medications can cause lichenoid reactions. They can also occur in association with graft versus host disease.

== Classification ==
Lichen planus lesions are so called because of their "lichen-like" appearance and can be classified by the site they involve, or by their morphology.

=== Site ===
Lichen planus may be categorized as affecting mucosal or cutaneous surfaces.

- Cutaneous forms are those affecting the skin, scalp, and nails.
- Mucosal forms are those affecting the lining of the gastrointestinal tract (mouth, pharynx, esophagus, stomach, anus), larynx, and other mucosal surfaces including the genitals, peritoneum, ears, nose, bladder and conjunctiva of the eyes.

=== Pattern ===
Lichen planus lesions can occur in many different forms or morphologies:

Papular
Papular form is the classic cutaneous lichen planus (CLP) lesion characterized by shiny, red or purple-colored, flat-topped papule. Lesions may have a thin, transparent, and adherent scale. Fine whitish points or lacy lines (Wickham's striae) may be seen on the surface of well-developed papules.
Annular
'Ring-shaped' lesions that develop gradually from single small pigmented spots into circular groups of papules with clear, unaffected skin in the center. The ring-like lesions may very slowly enlarge, coalesce, and morph into larger irregular (serpentine) bands, sometimes accompanied by lines (See Linear, below). Annular CLP is uncommon and classically involves the male genitalia (glans penis and penile shaft), groin, axilla, and also the extremities.
Linear
Papules are arranged in a line (the "Blaschko line"). This pattern may develop secondary to trauma (koebnerization) or, uncommonly, as a spontaneous, isolated eruption, usually on the extremities, and rarely on the face.
Hypertrophic
This pattern is characterized by hyperkeratotic thick pruritic red-brown to purple-gray plaques with follicular accentuation. Hypertrophic CLP commonly involves the extremities, especially the interphalangeal joints and the anterior legs in a symmetrical distribution. This form is also known as "lichen planus verrucosus".
Atrophic
This morphology is characterized by the presence of a few well-demarcated, white-bluish papules or plaques with central superficial atrophy. Atrophic CLP is the clinical endpoint of chronic annular or hypertrophic LP with atrophic lesions. The use of potent topical corticosteroids for a long time may predispose the patient to the development of atrophic lesions.
Bullous
This morphology is characterized by the development of vesicles and bullae with the skin lesions. This is a rare variant of lichen planus, also known as "vesiculobullous lichen planus".
Actinic time
Rare form presenting as nummular patches or plaques with a hypopigmented halo surrounding a hyperpigmented center. Actinic CLP is more prevalent in African Americans, Indians, and Middle Eastern individuals and commonly affects the sun-exposed areas.
Ulcerative
This morphology is characterized by chronic, painful bullae and ulceration of the feet, often with cicatricial sequelae evident. This is a rare variant of lichen planus.
Pigmented
This morphology is characterized by hyperpigmented, dark-brown macules in sun-exposed areas and flexural folds. This is a rare variant of lichen planus.
Follicular
Characterized by follicular, flat, elevated, or hemispherical erythematous papules with or without keratoses, presenting in groups or disseminated. The Graham‐Little–Piccardi–Lasseur syndrome, seen in a familial pattern and also predominantly in women, is characterized by the appearance of follicular LP on the trunk with LP follicularis decalvans on the scalp. Follicular LP on the scalp is more likely to lead to scarring alopecia.
Inverse
Characterized by extensive erythematous lesions with poorly defined borders and, in part, with lichenification. Inverse LP typically affects the axillae, inguinal creases, limb flexures, and submammary region. Pigmentation of the individual lesions at these inverse locations is typical. Additionally, keratotic papules and bizarre erosions can occur.

=== Overlap syndromes ===
Occasionally, lichen planus occurs with other conditions. For example:

- Lupus erythematosus overlap syndrome. Lesions of this syndrome share features of both lupus erythematosus and lichen planus. Lesions are usually large, hypopigmented, atrophic, and have a red to blue colour with minimal scaling. Telangectasia may be present.
- Lichen sclerosus overlap syndrome, sharing features of lichen planus and lichen sclerosus.

== Signs and symptoms ==
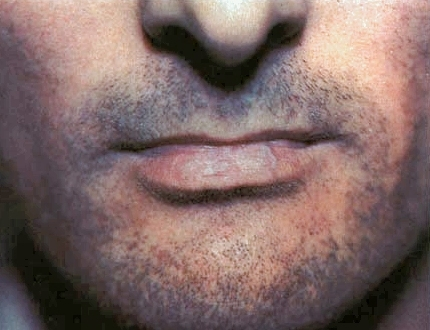
Lichen planus affecting the lower lip

Although lichen planus can present with a variety of lesions, the most common presentation is as a well-defined area of purple-coloured, itchy, flat-topped papules with interspersed lacy white lines (Wickham's striae). This description is known as the characteristic "6 Ps" of lichen planus: planar (flat-topped), purple, polygonal, pruritic, papules, and plaques. This rash, after regressing, is likely to leave an area of hyperpigmentation that slowly fades. That said, a variety of other lesions can also occur.

=== Skin ===
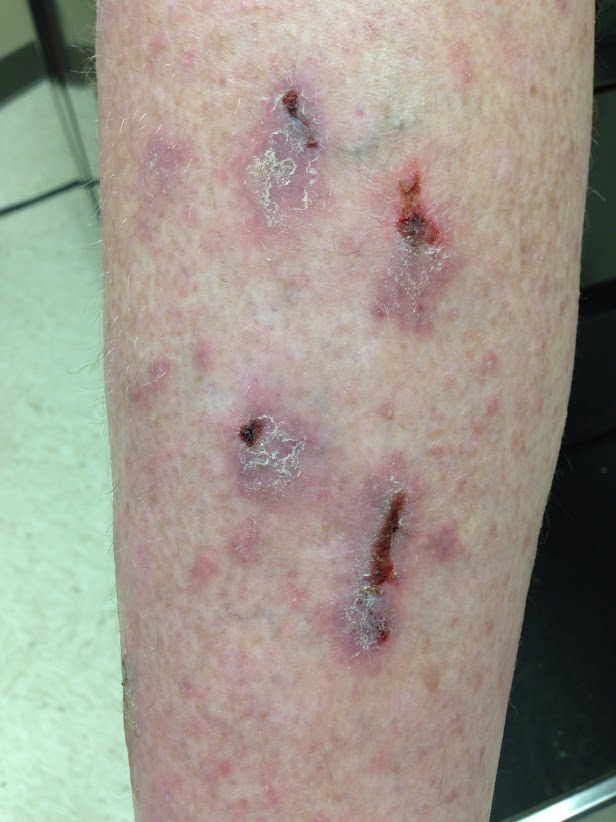
Cutaneous lichen planus on the shin

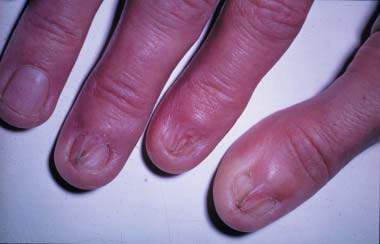
Pterygium formation in the nails caused by lichen planus

Variants of cutaneous lichen planus are distinguished based upon the appearance of the lesions and/or their distribution. Lesions can affect the:

- Extremities (face, dorsal hands, arms, and nape of neck). (Note: Cutaneous lichen planus affecting the extremities is also known as "lichen planus actinicus", "Actinic lichen niditus", "Lichen planus atrophicus annularis", "Lichen planus subtropicus", "Lichen planus tropicus", "Lichenoid melanodermatitis", and "Summertime actinic lichenoid eruption") This is more common in Middle Eastern countries in spring and summer, where sunlight appears to have a precipitating effect.
- Palms and soles
- Intertriginous areas of the skin. This is also known as "inverse lichen planus".
- Nails characterized by irregular longitudinal grooving and ridging of the nail plate, thinning of the nail plate, pterygium formation, shedding of the nail plate with atrophy of the nail bed, subungual keratosis, longitudinal erthronychia (red streaks), and subungual hyperpigmentation. A sand-papered appearance is present in around 10% of individuals with nail lichen planus.
- Hair and scalp. The scalp is rarely affected by a condition known as lichen planopilaris, acuminatus, follicular lichen planus, and peripilaris, characterised by violaceous, adherent follicular scale with progressive scarring alopecia. While lichen planus and lichen planopilaris may occur together, aside from sharing the term 'lichen' and revealing inflammation on skin biopsy, there is neither established data on their co-occurrence nor data to suggest a common etiology. Lichen planopilaris is considered an orphan disease with no definitive prevalence data and no proven effective treatments.

Other variants may include:

- Lichen planus pemphigoides is characterized by the development of tense blisters atop lesions of lichen planus or the development of vesicles de novo on uninvolved skin.
- Keratosis lichenoides chronica (also known as "Nekam's disease") is a rare dermatosis characterized by violaceous papular and nodular lesions, often arranged in a linear or reticulate pattern on the dorsal hands and feet, extremities, and buttock, and some cases manifest by seborrheic dermatitis-like eruption on the scalp and face; also, palmoplantar keratosis has been reported.
- Lichenoid keratoses (also known as "benign lichenoid keratosis", and "Solitary lichen planus") is a cutaneous condition characterized by brown to red scaling maculopapules, found on sun-exposed skin of extremities. Restated, this is a cutaneous condition usually characterized by a solitary dusky-red to violaceous papular skin lesion.
- Lichenoid dermatitis represents a wide range of cutaneous disorders characterized by lichen planus-like skin lesions.

=== Mucous membranes ===
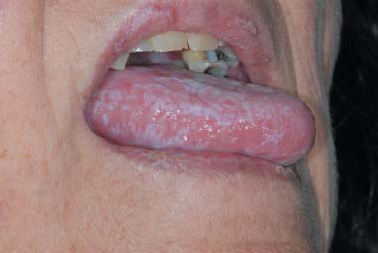
Lichen planus on the lips and the lateral border of the tongue

Lichen planus affecting mucosal surfaces may have one lesion or be multifocal. Examples of lichen planus affecting mucosal surfaces include:

- Esophageal lichen planus, affecting the esophageal mucosa. This can present with difficulty or pain when swallowing due to oesophageal inflammation, or as the development of an esophageal stricture. It has also been hypothesized that it is a precursor to squamous cell carcinoma of the esophagus.
- Genital lichen planus, which may cause lesions on the glans penis or skin of the scrotum in males, and the vulva or vagina in females. Symptoms may include lower urinary tract symptoms associated with stenosis of the urethra, painful sexual intercourse, and itching. In females, Vulvovaginal-gingival syndrome, is severe and distinct variant affecting the vulva, vagina, and gums, with complications including scarring, vaginal stricture formation, or vulva destruction. The corresponding syndrome in males, affecting the glans penis and gums, is the peno-gingival syndrome. It is associated with HLA-DQB1.

==== Mouth ====
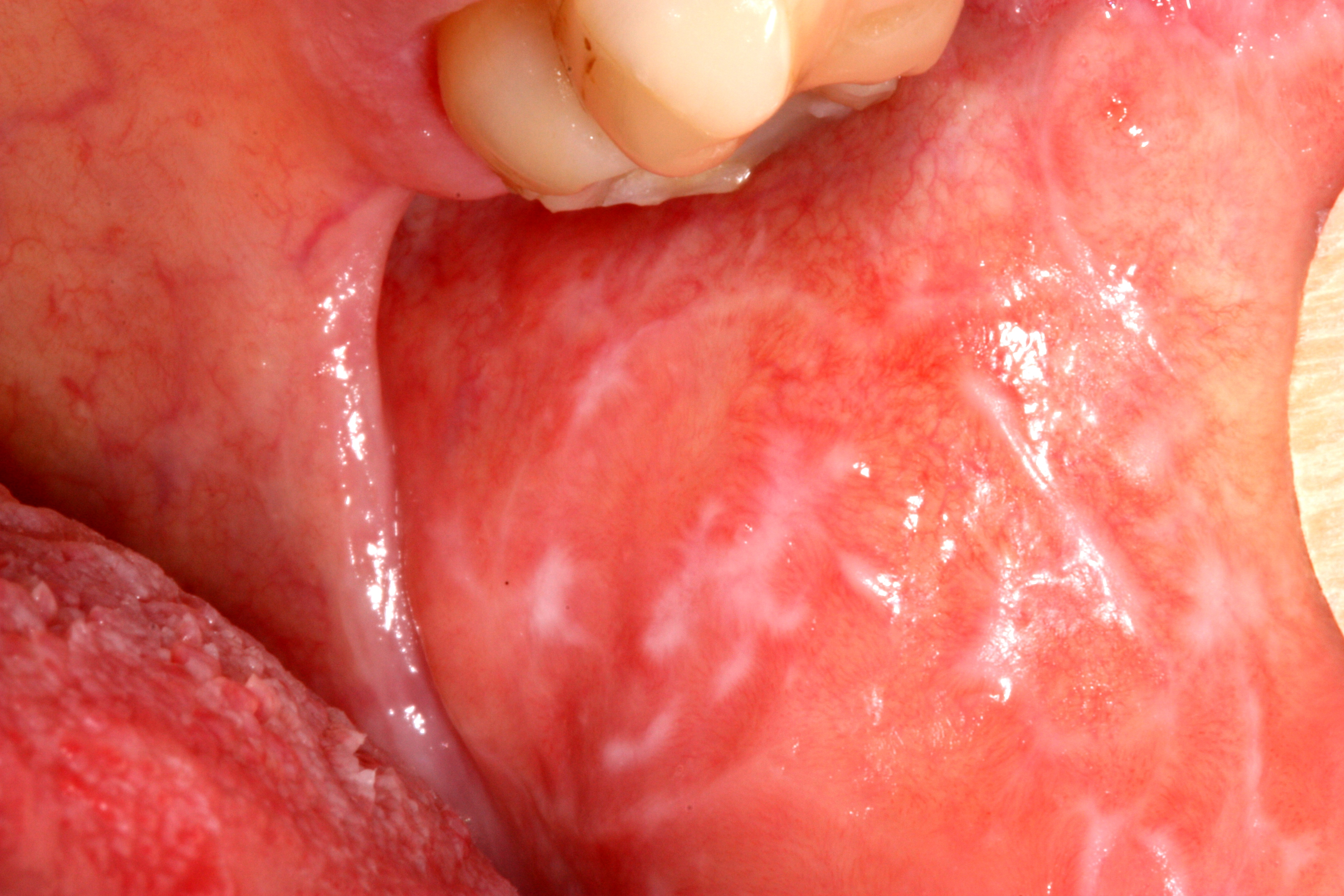
Classic Wickham's striae of non-erosive lichen planus in the left buccal mucosa (left cheek)

Oral lichen planus (also termed oral mucosal lichen planus), is a form of mucosal lichen planus, where lichen planus involves the oral mucosa, the lining of the mouth. This may occur in combination with other variants of lichen planus. Six clinical forms of oral lichen planus (OLP) are recognized:

Reticular
The most common presentation of oral lichen planus (OLP) is characterised by the net-like or spider web-like appearance of lacy white lines, known as Wickham's striae. This is usually asymptomatic. Reticular OLP may progress to the more severe subtypes, such as the erosive form, if left untreated.
Erosive or ulcerative
The second most common form and the most advanced form of oral lichen planus, is characterised by oral ulcers presenting with persistent, irregular areas of redness, ulcerations and erosions covered with a yellow slough. This can occur in one or more areas of the mouth. In 25% of people with erosive oral lichen planus, the gums are involved, described as desquamative gingivitis (a condition not unique to lichen planus). This may be the initial or only sign of the condition. Involvement of the dorsum of the tongue might cause an altered sense of taste (dysgeusia).
Papular
This form is characterized by small white pinpoint papules that are asymptomatic. Hence, they can be easily missed during a routine checkup. It is referred to as the initial and transient phase of OLP.
Plaque-like
Large, homogenous white patches are characteristic of this form, which may resemble leukoplakia. This form is more prevalent in tobacco smokers.
Atrophic
This form is a common presentation that has similarities to the erosive form. It has a more prominent atrophic lesion on a background of erythema with radiating white striae at the margins. Atrophic oral lichen planus may also manifest as desquamative gingivitis.
Bullous
Rare form of OLP characterized by fluid-filled vesicles ranging in size from 1 to 2 mm to several cm in diameter. The vesicles or bullae appear white or gray-purple in color and are fluctuant. The fluid in the vesicles is usually clear but may be hemorrhagic or purulent upon secondary infection. These rupture easily, and they leave an ulcerated, painful surface.

These types often coexist in the same individual. Oral lichen planus (OLP) tends to present bilaterally as mostly white lesions on the inner cheek, although any mucosal site in the mouth may be involved. Other sites, in decreasing order of frequency, may include the tongue, lips, gingivae, floor of the mouth, and, very rarely, the palate.

The most common symptoms of OLP include pain, burning, and discomfort in affected areas of the mouth. In severe cases, OLP is associated with debilitating pain causing difficulty speaking, eating, and swallowing, which may result in malnutrition and weight loss, or compromising airways and leading to breathing difficulties. In addition to physical discomfort, OLP can cause anxiety, depression, social isolation, and compromised quality of life, impacting patients' ability to work and participate in social life. Generally, OLP tends not to cause any discomfort or pain in mild cases, although many people experience significant soreness when eating or drinking acidic or spicy foodstuffs or beverages.

Oral lichen planus represents a serious chronic condition with significant unmet medical need. The FDA has recognized OLP as a serious disease warranting expanded access programs for investigational treatments, acknowledging the substantial impact on patients' daily functioning and quality of life. When symptoms arise, they are most commonly associated with the atrophic and ulcerative subtypes. These symptoms can include a burning sensation or severe pain. They may also experience mucosal bleeding in response to mild trauma, such as toothbrushing. Additionally, the Koebner phenomenon (the development of new lesions at sites of trauma) is not only present in cutaneous lichen planus (CLP) but can also occur in the setting of OLP.

Residual postinflammatory hyperpigmentation has been reported in association with OLP, manifesting as brown to black pigmentation on the oral mucosa, and may most likely occur in dark-skinned individuals.

OLP may occur as a sole manifestation of the disease or in conjunction with other clinical manifestations of LP, including cutaneous LP, genital LP, nail LP, and lichen planopilaris (scalp LP).

== Causes ==
Cutaneous LP is a self-limiting condition. It usually resolves within 6 to 12 months. Oral LP is a non-infectious, chronic inflammatory condition that involves the oral mucosa and may be accompanied by skin lesions. The etiology of oral LP are unknown.

It is not clear whether the mechanisms causing isolated oral LP are different from those causing oral LP with cutaneous LP. An immune-mediated mechanism where basal keratinocytes are being targeted as foreign antigens by activated T cells, especially CD8+ T cells, has been proposed. Upregulation of intercellular adhesion molecule-1 (ICAM-1) and cytokines associated with T-helper 1 immune response, may also play an important role in the pathogenesis of lichen planus.

Stress is thought to play a role in the pathogenesis of oral LP. Patients with anxiety and depression are reported more commonly with oral LP if compared to normal healthy individuals. Some studies have indicated that stressful events can induce LP lesions in otherwise healthy individuals. However, a cause-and-effect relationship between stress and the onset of oral LP has not been demonstrated.

Several potential triggers of oral LP have been proposed over the years, mainly

1. Hypersensitivity reaction
  - Restorative material (e.g., amalgam and composite) or drugs can cause hypersensitivity reaction and lead to oral LP.
  - Oral LP usually resolves upon removal of the trigger. This is characteristic of oral LP.
2. Viral infection

== Pathogenesis ==
Oral LP is considered a T-cell-mediated chronic inflammatory tissue reaction that results in a cytotoxic reaction against epithelial basal cells. The inflammatory infiltrate in oral LP is primarily composed of CD8+ T cells. A potential pathway for CD8+ T cell-mediated cytotoxicity in oral LP is described as follows:

Antigens presented on MHC 1 molecules activates CD8+ T cells on keratinocytes or by encounters with activated CD4+ helper T cells or cytokines produced by activated CD4+ helper T cells

Activated CD8+ T cells induce keratinocyte apoptosis through various mechanisms such as secretion of tumor necrosis factor (TNF)-alpha, secretion of granzyme B, or Fas-Fas ligand interactions. Chemokines are produced by activated CD8+ T cells that attract additional inflammatory cells, thereby promoting continued inflammation.

Other mechanisms that have been proposed include:

- Upregulation of matrix metalloproteinases that disrupt the epithelial basement membrane zone and allow entry of immune cells into the epidermis,
- The release of proinflammatory mediators and proteases by mast cells, and
- Perturbations in the innate immune response that may involve toll-like receptors.

Oral LP may also be caused by a genetic factor that influences the immune function. A separate study performed in China found an association between a polymorphism in the TNF-alpha gene and risk for oral LP in a subset of patients. An Italian study found a significant increase in a genetic polymorphism of the first intron of the interferon (IFN)-gamma promoter in patients with oral LP compared with controls.

== Diagnosis ==
=== Skin ===
Patient history and clinical presentation must be obtained to diagnose lichen planus. Patients with suspected cutaneous lichen planus must be evaluated clinically through patient interviews and physical examinations. Patients should be questioned about their medication history, any history of pruritus or genital pain, and history of dysphagia or odynophagia. Examination of the entire cutaneous surface, including the scalp, oral cavity, and external genitalia, must be included. Wickham's striae are often seen during microscopic examination of cutaneous lesions of lichen planus.

To confirm the diagnosis of cutaneous lichen planus, a skin biopsy can be done. A punch biopsy of sufficient depth to the mid dermis is usually significant. Immunofluorescence studies are not always needed. Direct immunofluorescence (DIF) can be useful in patients with bullous lesions to differentiate the condition from an autoimmune vesiculobullous disease.

=== Mouth ===
A diagnosis of oral lichen planus (LP) is confirmed through review of the patient history, physical examination, and histologic findings.

The clinical evaluation should include a patient history that assesses the following:

- History of LP involving other body sites or other skin disorders that may present with similar findings (e.g., autoimmune blistering diseases)
- Presence of associated symptoms (e.g., pain, burning)
- Medication the patients are taking within the few weeks to months after drug initiation e.g. antihypertensives, antidepressants, diuretics, antidiabetics, NSAIDs, etc. to evaluate for the possibility of an oral lichenoid drug eruption
- History of dental restorations, use of dental appliances, or oral exposure to substances that may cause oral lichenoid contact eruptions (e.g., dental composites, cobalt chromium-based dentures, etc.)

A full examination that includes the evaluation of the mucosal and cutaneous surfaces, including the vulva, vagina, penis, scalp, and nails, should be performed. Thorough examination may detect extraoral manifestations of LP that provide additional support for the diagnosis or help identify clinical findings that suggest another diagnosis.

Tissue biopsies of oral LP help confirm the diagnosis and are particularly of value for erythematous and erosive LP, which share features with multiple other mucosal disorders, including oral malignancy. Biopsies to confirm oral LP are less essential in patients who present with classic reticular LP, particularly in patients in whom a diagnosis of LP has already been confirmed through biopsy of an extraoral manifestation of this disorder.

=== Differential diagnosis ===
==== Skin ====
1. Lichenoid drug eruption
  - The cutaneous manifestations resemble idiopathic lichen planus.
2. Chronic graft-versus-host disease
  - The history of preceding hematopoietic cell transplant is helpful for diagnosis
3. Psoriasis
4. Atopic dermatitis
5. Cutaneous lupus erythematosus
6. Discoid lupus erythematosus

==== Mouth ====
===== Oral lichenoid drug reaction =====
Lichenoid drug eruptions may be caused by a variety of systemic medications and share clinical features with oral LP. Histologic findings of a deep mixed infiltrate with lymphocytes, plasma cells, and neutrophils (with or without eosinophils) and perivascular inflammation favor this diagnosis.

===== Oral lichenoid contact reaction (allergic contact mucositis) =====
A variety of substances may cause oral lichenoid contact reactions. The clinical and histologic features of oral lichenoid contact reactions are similar to oral LP. Patch testing and recognition of the proximity of an offending substance to the eruption can aid with diagnosis.

===== Autoimmune blistering diseases =====
Mucous membrane pemphigoid and other autoimmune blistering diseases may present with oral erosions and desquamative gingivitis similar to that seen in erosive LP. Biopsies for routine histologic examination and direct immunofluorescence are useful for distinguishing these disorders from oral LP.

===== Graft-versus-host disease (GVHD) =====
Lacy, reticulated plaques or erosions that resemble oral LP may occur in GVHD. The histologic findings of these disorders are also similar. The patient history is useful for differentiating chronic GVHD from oral LP. Oral involvement in acute GVHD is less well characterized than chronic GVHD, but has been associated with erythematous, erosive, ulcerative, or lichenoid oral lesions.

===== Leukoplakia =====
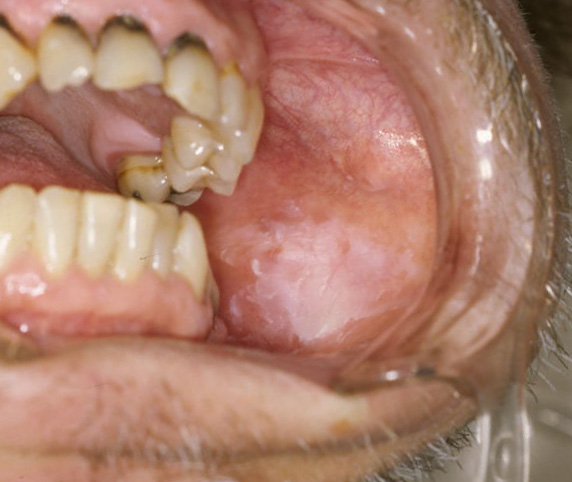
Leukoplakia

Leukoplakia is a manifestation of squamous epithelial hyperplasia that may be a precursor to oral squamous cell carcinoma. White patches or plaques usually appear on the oral mucosa. To rule out malignancy, a biopsy of leukoplakia is indicated.

===== Oral squamous cell carcinoma =====
Oral squamous cell carcinoma (SCC) can present as erythematous or white patches, ulcers, or exophytic masses. The highest risk for oral SCC may occur in patients with erythematous or erosive oral LP. A biopsy is indicated.

===== Leukoedema =====
Leukoedema is a common, benign finding in the oral cavity that presents as white-gray, somewhat translucent plaques on the mucosa. The buccal mucosa is the most common site for involvement. Symptoms are absent, and no treatment is necessary.

===== Oropharyngeal candidiasis =====
Oropharyngeal candidiasis (also known as thrush) is a common infection that has a predilection for infants, older adults with dentures, immunosuppressed individuals, and individuals utilizing intraoral corticosteroid therapy. Patients present with white plaques or erythematous patches on the buccal mucosa, palate, tongue, or oropharynx that may be mistaken for reticular LP.

=== Histopathology ===
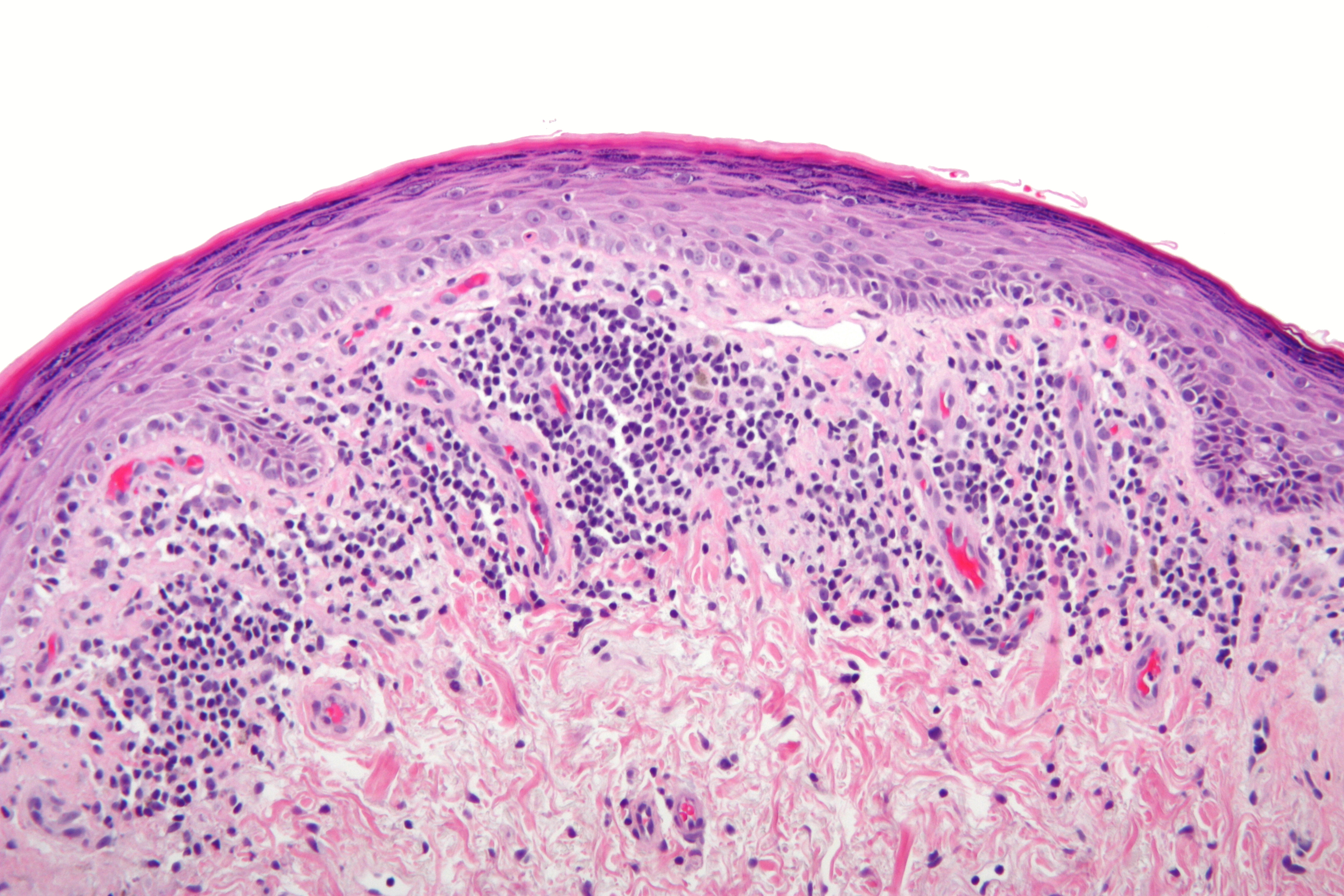
Histopathology of lichen planus

The histologic findings of oral LP can offer strong support for the diagnosis, but are not pathognomonic. Clinical correlation is required. Common histologic findings of oral LP include:

- Parakeratosis and slight acanthosis of the epithelium
- Saw-toothed rete ridges
- Liquefaction (hydropic) degeneration of the basal layer with apoptotic keratinocytes (referred to as Civatte, colloid, hyaline, or cytoid bodies)
- An amorphous band of eosinophilic material at the basement membrane composed of fibrin or fibrinogen.
- A lichenoid (band-like) lymphocytic infiltrate immediately subjacent to the epithelium.

Nonetheless, interpreting the histopathological features of oral LP has been historically associated with high intra-observer and inter-observer variabilities.

== Treatment ==
There is no cure for lichen planus, and so treatment of cutaneous and oral lichen planus is for symptomatic relief or due to cosmetic concerns. When medical treatment is pursued, first-line treatment typically involves either topical or systemic corticosteroids, and removal of any triggers. Without treatment, most lesions will spontaneously resolve within 6–9 months for cutaneous lesions, and longer for mucosal lesions.

=== Skin ===
Many treatments have been reported for cutaneous lichen planus; there is a general lack of evidence of efficacy for any treatment. The mainstay of localized skin lesions is topical steroids. Additional treatments include retinoids, such as acitretin, or sulfasalazine. Narrow band UVB phototherapy or systemic PUVA therapy are known treatment modalities for generalized disease.

=== Mouth ===
Reassurance that the condition is benign, elimination of precipitating factors, and improving oral hygiene are considered initial management for symptomatic OLP, and these measures are reported to be useful. Treatment usually involves topical corticosteroids (such as betamethasone, clobetasol, dexamethasone, and triamcinolone) and analgesics, or if these are ineffective and the condition is severe, then systemic corticosteroids may be used. Calcineurin inhibitors (such as pimecrolimus, tacrolimus or cyclosporin) are sometimes used. While topical steroids are widely accepted as first-line treatment for mucosal lichen planus, there is only weak evidence to support their effectiveness for erosive oral lichen planus.

Currently, there are no FDA-approved therapies specifically for OLP, representing a significant unmet medical need. Available treatments are palliative rather than curative and often provide inadequate symptom control. Current treatment limitations include: Poor drug delivery to oral mucosal surfaces due to saliva clearance; Limited contact time between topical medications and moist mucosal tissues; Systemic side effects with oral immunosuppressants; Treatment failures and symptom relapses; Secondary complications, including oral candidiasis from chronic corticosteroid use.

== Prognosis ==
Cutaneous lichen planus lesions typically resolve within six months to a year. However, some variants, such as the hypertrophic variant, might persist for years if left untreated or unmonitored.

It is found that cutaneous lichen planus does not carry a risk of skin cancer. In contrast to cutaneous LP, which is self limited, lichen planus lesions in the mouth may persist for many years, and tend to be difficult to treat, with relapses being common.

Although this condition was first described almost a century ago, it has been reported that its associated oral cancer risk has been exaggerated. Overall, it is found that patients with erythematous or erosive oral lichen planus have a higher risk of oral squamous cell carcinoma compared to patients diagnosed with other variants.

Due to the possibility that oral LP may increase risk for oral cancer, patients with oral lichen planus are encouraged to avoid activities known to increase the risk for oral cancer, such as smoking and alcohol use. OLP carries a significant risk of malignant transformation to oral squamous cell carcinoma. The chronic inflammatory nature of OLP creates an environment that may predispose to dysplastic changes and eventual malignant transformation. Studies demonstrate that patients with erythematous or erosive oral lichen planus have a markedly higher risk of developing oral squamous cell carcinoma compared to patients with other variants or the general population.

Cancer surveillance is critical, as dysplastic lesions may be inadvertently diagnosed as "lichenoid mucositis with mild reactive epithelial atypia" when they may actually represent dysplasia with malignant potential. Patients with oral lichen planus should be followed up at least every 6 to 12 months to assess the disease activity, changes in symptoms, or detect early signs of malignancy.

== Epidemiology ==
The overall estimated prevalence of lichen planus in worldwide population is in the range of 0.2% to 5%.

It occurs more commonly in females, with a 3:2 ratio, and most cases are diagnosed between the ages of 30 and 60, but it can occur at any age.

Lichen planus can occur in patients as diverse cutaneous manifestations alone or in combination with mucosal lichen planus and, or lichen planus of the nails. Study shows that the frequency of mucosal involvement of lichen planus patients is 30- 70%.

Oral lichen planus is relatively common, It is one of the most common mucosal diseases. The prevalence in the general population is about 1.27–2.0%, with an estimated 6-7 million people affected in the United States alone. The disease predominantly affects middle-aged individuals (30–60 years) with a female-to-male ratio of 2:1. Oral lichen planus in children is rare. About 50% of females with oral lichen planus were reported to have undiagnosed vulvar lichen planus.

Some studies suggest that cutaneous lichen planus is more commonly found in men whilst oral lichen planus lesions are more commonly found in women.

== History ==
Lichen planus was first described in 1869 by Erasmus Wilson as an inflammatory disorder with unknown etiology. Initially, the characteristic surface markings or striae were described by Weyl in 1885. In 1895, Wickham further explained the characteristic of the lesion, now known as Wickham striae. Further on, Darier explained the presence of such characteristic markings by correlating with an increased thickness of the granular cell layer. Fritz Williger published the first documented clinical case of malignant transformation of oral lichen planus in 1924. The coexistence of oral, cervical, and stomach lichen planus lesions was described by Guogerot and Burnier in 1937. A similar variant of mucosal lichen planus, the vulvovaginal-gingival syndrome, with erosive lesions involving oral and vulvovaginal mucosa were introduced by Pelisse and colleagues in 1982.

The origin of the word is believed to be from the Greek word λειχήν (leikhḗn), originally 'liverwort', and the Latin word planus, 'flat, even'.

== Research ==
Apremilast is undergoing investigation as a potential treatment.
