= Scarring hair loss =

- Other names: scarring alopecia
- Specialty: Dermatology

Scarring hair loss, also known as cicatricial alopecia, is the loss of hair which is accompanied with scarring. This is in contrast to non scarring hair loss.

It can be caused by a diverse group of rare disorders that destroy the hair follicle, replace it with scar tissue, and cause permanent hair loss. A variety of distributions are possible. In some cases, hair loss is gradual, without symptoms, and is unnoticed for long periods. In other cases, hair loss is associated with severe itching, burning and pain and is rapidly progressive. The inflammation that destroys the follicle is below the skin surface and there is usually no "scar" seen on the scalp. Affected areas of the scalp may show little signs of inflammation, or have redness, scaling, increased or decreased pigmentation, pustules, or draining sinuses. Scarring hair loss occurs in otherwise healthy people of all ages and is seen worldwide.

== Signs and symptoms ==
It is important to continue to watch for symptoms and signs of active disease during and after treatment to ensure that the disease is responding adequately and has not re-activated after therapy has been discontinued. Response to therapy may be indicated by the resolution of scalp symptoms such as itching, pain, tenderness, or burning, by improvement in the signs of scalp inflammation such as decreased redness, scaling or pustules, and by halting or slowing the progression of hair loss. A dermatologist can document and monitor a patient's cicatricial alopecia using these guidelines, and with the pull test. Photographs of the scalp may be useful in monitoring the course of the disease and response to treatment.

== Causes ==
The cause of the various cicatricial alopecias is poorly understood. However, all cicatricial alopecias involve inflammation directed at the upper part of the hair follicle where the stem cells and sebaceous gland (oil gland) are located. If the stem cells and sebaceous gland are destroyed, there is then no possibility for regeneration of the hair follicle, and permanent hair loss results.

Cicatricial alopecias are not contagious. In general, cicatricial alopecias are not associated with other illnesses, and usually occur in otherwise healthy people.

Cicatricial alopecias affect both men and women, most commonly adults, although all ages may be affected. Epidemiologic studies have not been performed to determine the incidence of cicatricial alopecias. In general, they are not common.

The majority of patients with cicatricial alopecia have no family history of a similar condition. The one exception is Central centrifugal cicatricial alopecia, which primarily affects women of African ancestry and may occur in several women in the same family. While it is possible to have more than one type of hair loss condition, non-scarring forms of hair loss do not turn into scarring forms of hair loss.

== Diagnosis ==
A scalp biopsy is essential for the diagnosis of cicatricial alopecia and is the necessary first step, as it can be hard to know the diagnosis for sure without a biopsy. Findings of the scalp biopsy, including the type of inflammation present, location and amount of inflammation, and other changes in the scalp, are necessary to diagnose the type of cicatricial alopecia, to determine the degree of activity, and to select appropriate therapy.

Clinical evaluation of the scalp is also important. Symptoms of itching, burning, pain, or tenderness usually signal ongoing activity. Signs of scalp inflammation include redness, scaling, and pustules. However, in some cases there are few symptoms or signs and only the scalp biopsy demonstrates the active inflammation. The overall extent and pattern of hair loss is noted and sometimes photographed for future comparison. A hair "pull test" is performed to see if growing, or anagen, where hairs are pulled out easily. The pulled hairs are mounted on a slide and the hair bulbs are viewed with a light microscope to determine how many are growing hairs and how many are resting hairs. In addition, if pustules are present, cultures are taken to identify which microbes, if any, may be contributing to the inflammation. A thorough evaluation that includes all of these parameters is important in diagnosing a cicatricial alopecia and in identifying features in individual patients that will help the selection of therapy.

New diagnostic techniques, such as trichoscopy may be used for non-invasive differential diagnosis of cicatricial alopecia.

Diagnosis and treatment of cicatricial alopecias is often challenging. For this reason, it is helpful to be evaluated by a dermatologist with a special interest or expertise in scalp and hair disorders, and who is familiar with current diagnostic methods and therapies.

=== Classification ===
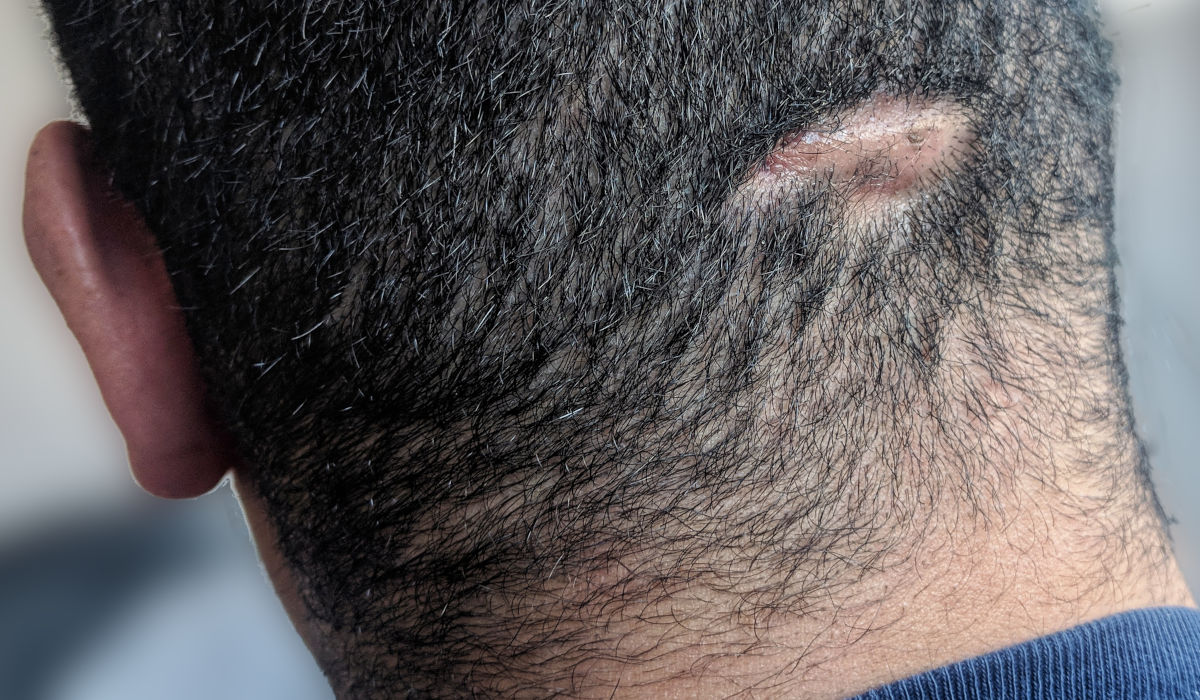
Boggy, suppurative nodule with patchy hair loss typical of dissecting cellulitis of the scalp.

Cicatricial alopecias are classified as primary or secondary. This discussion is confined to the primary cicatricial alopecias in which the hair follicle is the target of the destructive inflammatory process. In secondary cicatricial alopecias, destruction of the hair follicle is incidental to a non-follicle-directed process or external injury, such as severe infections, burns, radiation, tumors, or traction.

Primary cicatricial alopecias are further classified by the type of inflammatory cells that destroy the hair follicle during the active stage of the disease. The inflammation may predominantly involve lymphocytes or neutrophils. Cicatricial alopecias that predominantly involve lymphocytic inflammation include lichen planopilaris, frontal fibrosing alopecia, central centrifugal alopecia, and pseudopelade (Brocq). Cicatricial alopecias that are due to predominantly neutrophilic inflammation include folliculitis decalvans, tufted folliculitis, and dissecting cellulitis of the scalp. Sometimes the inflammation shifts from a predominantly neutrophilic process to a lymphocytic process. A cicatricial alopecia with a mixed inflammatory infiltrate is folliculitis keloidalis.

== Treatment ==
As mentioned above, primary cicatricial alopecias are classified by the predominant type of inflammatory cells that attack the hair follicles, such as lymphocytes, neutrophils, or mixed inflammatory cells. Treatment strategies are different for each subtype and detailed treatment options are beyond the scope of this discussion. However, certain general principals are reviewed below.

Treatment of the lymphocytic group of cicatricial alopecias (including lichen planopilaris, frontal fibrosing alopecia, central centrifugal alopecia, and pseudopelade (Brocq) involves use of anti-inflammatory medications. The goal of treatment is to decrease or eliminate the lymphocytic inflammatory cells that are attacking and destroying the hair follicle. Oral medications may include hydroxychloroquine, doxycycline, mycophenolate mofetil, cyclosporine, or corticosteroids. Topical medications may include corticosteroids, tacrolimus, pimecrolimus, or Derma-Smooth/FS scalp oil. Triamcinolone acetonide, a corticosteroid, may be injected into inflamed, symptomatic areas of the scalp.

Treatment of the neutrophilic group of cicatricial alopecias (folliculitis decalvans, tufted folliculitis) is directed at eliminating the predominant pathogenic microbes that are invariably involved in the inflammatory process. Oral antibiotics are the mainstay of therapy, and topical antibiotics may be used to supplement the oral antibiotics. In dissecting cellulitis, pathogenic microbes are not usually present. Isotretinoin in small doses may be helpful in treating dissecting cellulitis.

Treatment of the mixed group of cicatricial alopecias (folliculitis keloidalis) may include antimicrobials, isotretinoin, and anti-inflammatory medications.

Patients are recommended to discuss any treatment with a dermatologist, who also explains potential side effects, as well as laboratory tests that are needed before starting treatment and sometimes are monitored during treatment.

The course of cicatricial alopecia is usually prolonged. Treatment is continued until the symptoms and signs of scalp inflammation are controlled, and progression of the condition has been slowed. In other words, itching, pain, tenderness, and burning have cleared, scalp redness, scaling, and/or pustules are no longer present, and the progression of the hair loss has been stopped or slowed. Treatment may then be stopped. Unfortunately, the cicatricial alopecias may reactivate after a quiet period and treatment may have to be repeated.

Surgical treatment for cosmetic benefit is an option in some cases after the disease has been inactive for one to two or more years. Hair restoration surgery or scalp reduction may be considered in these instances.

=== Hair regrowth ===
Hair will not regrow once the follicle is destroyed. However, it may be possible to treat the inflammation in and around surrounding follicles before they are destroyed, and for this reason it is important to begin treatment as early as possible to halt the inflammatory process. Minoxidil solution (2% or 5%) applied twice daily to the scalp may be helpful to stimulate any small, remaining, unscarred follicles. The progression of hair loss is unpredictable. In some cases, progression is slow and there is always sufficient hair remaining to cover the affected scalp areas; in other cases, progression can be rapid and extensive.

=== Hair care ===
Hair care products and shampoos can generally be used with any frequency desired, as long as the products are gentle and non-irritating to the scalp. Hair pieces, wigs, hats, and scarves may be used freely.

== See also ==
- Noncicatricial alopecia
- List of cutaneous conditions
