= List of diseases (W) =

This is a list of diseases starting with the letter "W".

== W ==
- W syndrome

== Wa ==
=== Waa–Wan ===
- Waaler–Aarskog syndrome
- Waardenburg anophthalmia syndrome
- Waardenburg syndrome
  - Waardenburg syndrome type 1
  - Waardenburg syndrome type 2
  - Waardenburg syndrome type 2A
  - Waardenburg syndrome type 2B
  - Waardenburg syndrome type 3
  - Waardenburg syndrome, type 4
  - Waardenburg type Pierpont
- Wagner's disease
- Wagner–Stickler syndrome
- WAGR syndrome
- Walbaum–Titran–Durieux–Crepin syndrome
- Waldenström's macroglobulinemia
- Waldmann disease
- Walker–Dyson syndrome (aniridia–intellectual disability syndrome)
- Wallerian degeneration
- Wallis–Zieff–Goldblatt syndrome
- Wandering spleen

=== War–Wat ===
- Warburg–Sjo–Fledelius syndrome; see Micro syndrome
- Warburg–Thomsen syndrome
- Warburton–Anyane–Yeboa syndrome
- Warfarin antenatal infection
- Warfarin necrosis
- Warkany syndrome
- Warman–Mulliken–Hayward syndrome
- Warm-reacting-antibody hemolytic anemia
- Warts
- Waterhouse–Friderichsen syndrome
- Watermelon stomach
- Watson syndrome

== We ==
=== Wea–Wer ===
- Weaver–Johnson syndrome
- Weaver-like syndrome
- Weaver syndrome
- Weaver–Williams syndrome
- Weber–Parkes syndrome (capillary malformation–arteriovenous malformation 1)
- Weber–Sturge–Dimitri syndrome
- Weber–Christian disease
- Webster–Deming syndrome (craniofrontonasal dysplasia–Poland anomaly syndrome)
- Wegener's granulomatosis (granulomatosis with polyangiitis)
- Wegmann–Jones–Smith syndrome
- Weil syndrome
- Weinstein–Kliman–Scully syndrome
- Weismann–Netter–Stuhl syndrome
- Weissenbacher–Zweymuller syndrome
- Welander distal myopathy, Swedish type
- Weleber–Hecht–Bigley syndrome
- Wellesley–Carmen–French syndrome
- Wells–Jankovic syndrome (spastic paraparesis–deafness syndrome)
- Wells syndrome
- Werdnig–Hoffmann disease
- Werner's syndrome
- Wernicke–Korsakoff syndrome
- Wernicke's encephalopathy

=== Wes ===
- West Nile virus
- West syndrome
- Westerhof–Beemer–Cormane syndrome
- Western equine encephalitis
- Westphall disease

== Wh ==
- Wheat hypersensitivity
- Whipple disease
- Whitaker syndrome
- White sponge nevus
- Whooping cough (pertussis)
- Whyte–Murphy syndrome (osteopathia striata–pigmentary dermopathy–white forelock syndrome)

== Wi ==
=== Wie–Win ===
- Wieacker syndrome
- Wiedemann–Grosse–Dibbern syndrome
- Wiedemann–Oldigs–Oppermann syndrome (hirsutism–skeletal dysplasia–intellectual disability syndrome)
- Wiedemann–Opitz syndrome
- Wiedemann–Rautenstrauch syndrome
- Wildervanck syndrome
- Wilkes–Stevenson syndrome
- Wilkie–Taylor–Scambler syndrome
- Willebrand disease, acquired
- Willebrand disease
- Willems–De vries syndrome
- Williams syndrome
- Wilms' tumor
  - Wilms tumor and pseudohermaphroditism
  - Wilms tumor radial bilateral aplasia
  - Wilms tumor-aniridia syndrome
- Wilson's disease
- Wilson–Turner syndrome
- Winchester syndrome
- Winkelman–Bethge–Pfeiffer syndrome (non-acquired combined pituitary hormone deficiency with spine abnormalities)
- Winship–Viljoen–Leary syndrome (microcephalus cardiomyopathy syndrome)
- Winter–Harding–Hyde syndrome
- Winter–Shortland–Temple syndrome

=== Wis–Wit ===
- Wisconsin syndrome
- Wiskott–Aldrich syndrome
- Witkop syndrome

== Wo–Wy ==
- Wohlwill–Andrade syndrome (ATTRV30M amyloidosis)
- Wolcott–Rallison syndrome
- Wolff–Parkinson–White syndrome
- Wolf–Hirschhorn syndrome
- Wolfram syndrome
- Wolman disease
- Woodhouse–Sakati syndrome
- Woods–Black–Norbury syndrome (X-linked immunoneurologic disorder)
- Woods–Leversha–Rogers syndrome
- Wooly hair syndrome
  - Woolly hair autosomal recessive
  - Woolly hair hypotrichosis everted lower lip outstanding ears
  - Woolly hair palmoplantar keratoderma cardiac anomalies
  - Woolly hair, congenital
- Worster-Drought syndrome, various syndromes identified by Dr. Worster-Drought
  - Worster-Drought syndrome associated with cerebral palsy
  - Worster-Drought syndrome, also known as familial British dementia
- Worth syndrome
- Wright–Dick syndrome
- Wrinkly skin syndrome
- Writer's cramp
- WT limb blood syndrome
- Wyburn–Mason syndrome
