= Lidia Rudnicka =

Polish-American dermatologist

Prof. Lidia Rudnicka
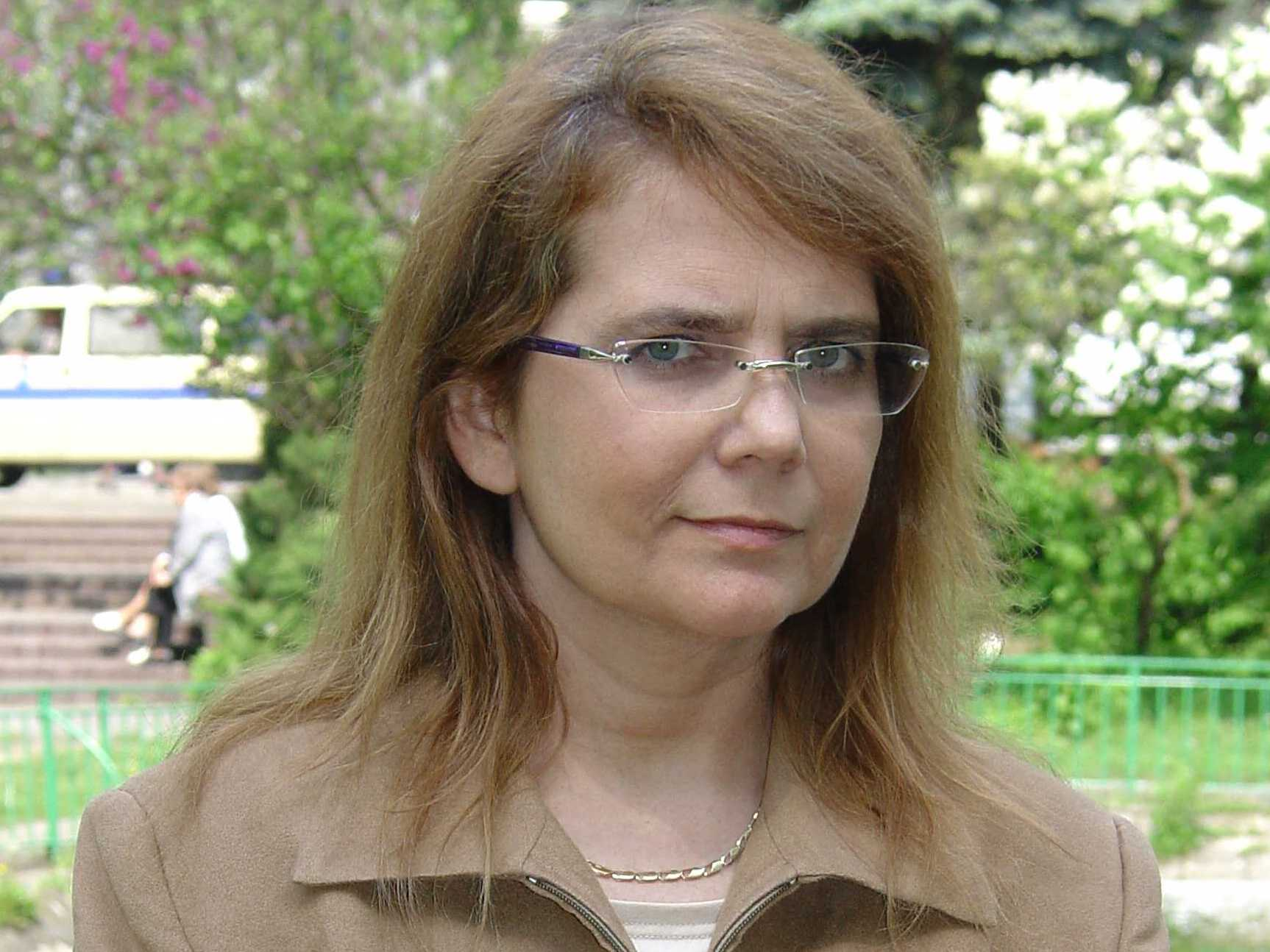
- Professor Lidia Rudnicka
- Born: February 19, 1960; Chicago, Illinois

Academic background
- Education: Medical University of Warsaw
- Thesis: (1990)

Academic work
- Discipline: Dermatology
- Sub-discipline: Trichoscopy, alopecia, scleroderma
- Website: lidiarudnicka.pl

Lidia Rudnicka (born February 19, 1960, in Chicago, Illinois) is a Polish-American dermatologist with contributions to the field of scleroderma research, hair diseases and melanoma prevention.

Rudnicka was the chairman of the Department of Dermatology CSK MSWiA (Central Clinical Hospital of Ministry of Internal Affaires) in Warsaw, Poland (1998–2014). She is currently (starting 2014) chairman of the Department of Dermatology at Medical University of Warsaw. She is president of the Polish Dermatological Society, first president of the International Society of Trichoscopy, regional editor for the International Journal of Trichology, and associate editor of the Journal of the European Academy of Dermatology and Venereology. From 1990 to 1993, she worked in American and European institutions: Food and Drug Administration (USA), University of Liège (Belgium) and Thomas Jefferson University in Philadelphia (USA).

Additionally, Rudnicka has authored or co-authored over 200 articles and book chapters, mainly concerning autoimmune skin diseases, biological therapies, videodermoscopy, trichoscopy, epidemiology of skin diseases and managing medical institutions.

== Biography ==
=== Academic career ===
Rudnicka graduated from Warsaw Medical School (having previously studied in Bonn and Cologne) in 1986. She went on to receive PhD in medical sciences in 1990 and habilitation degree in 1994. From 1987 to 1998 she worked as an Assistant Lecturer and Assistant Professor in Department of Dermatology, Warsaw Medical School. In 2001 she became Full Professor in medical sciencesSince 2008 Rudnicka has been professor at the Faculty of Health Sciences in Medical University of Warsaw.

=== Professional career ===
Rudnicka started her professional career in 1986 in Department of Immunopathology of National Institute of Hygiene. In 1987 she became Assistant Lecturer in Department of Dermatology, Warsaw Medical University. In 1986, she became chairman of the Department of Dermatology, CSK MSWiA (1998–2014). From 1990 to 1993 she worked in American and European institutions: Food and Drug Administration (National Institute of Health; 1990), University of Liège (research laboratory of Department of Dermatology; 1991) and Thomas Jefferson University, Philadelphia (Department of Dermatology; 1991–1993). Since 2007 Rudnicka has been a member of National Examinary Commission for dermatology and venerology exams. In 2014 she was appointed chairman of the Department of Dermatology at Medical University of Warsaw. She participated in works of Institute of Clinical and Experimental Medicine, Polish Academy of Sciences.

=== Scleroderma research ===
Rudnicka's early work was related to the role of Natural Killer Cells and adhesion molecules in systemic sclerosis (scleroderma) and showed that activated peripheral blood mononuclear cells of scleroderma patients exhibit increased adhesion to vascular endothelial cells, which is an early event, preceding formation of perivascular lymphocytic infiltrates and development of skin fibrosis.

She is the author of the hypothesis linking etiology of systemic sclerosis to a mutation in the topoisomerase I gene and abnormal topoisomerase I expression. She believes that presence of anti-topoisomerse I antibodies in sera of patients with scleroderma represents a protective reaction to these abnormalities. This hypothesis was partly confirmed by her studies. The study on which Urszula Nowicka's doctoral thesis was based showed a mutation in the 3’ coding region of the topoisomerase gene in 56% of patients with anti-topo I – positive (Scl70-positive) systemic sclerosis. It was also indicated that specific antibodies penetrate into the nuclei of fibroblasts and inhibit the activity of topoisomerase I. Moreover, the studies evidenced that topoisomerase I inhibitor, camptothecin, down-regulates the expression of type I collagen in fibroblasts of scleroderma patients and yields immunosuppressive effects. Certain cytokines were shown to increase the activity of topoisomerase I in dermal.

The hypothesis by Rudnicka was discussed during medical conferences, but was never confirmed by other researchers. However, the findings related to the role of camptothecin and its potential therapeutical use were reaffirmed in the study by Zhang et al. conducted in patients with keloid.

Another observation by Rudnicka and her co-workers, which may be potentially beneficial as far as managing systemic sclerosis is concerned, was abnormally high expression of prolactin in peripheral mononuclear cells obtained from patients.

=== Hair diseases and Trichoscopy ===
A second field of research of Rudnicka is related to hair and scalp disorders. She made a major contribution to development of hair and scalp dermoscopy (trichoscopy) and was the first to coin the term trichoscopy. Her and her co-workers’ studies on genetic hair disorders showed that it is possible to diagnose genetic hair shaft abnormalities in children without the need of pulling hairs for microscopic evaluation. In 2005, Rudnicka and Malgorzata Olszewska used videodermatoscopy in assessing disease severity and monitoring impact of dutasteride therapy on hair thickness and hair shaft heterogeneity in androgenic alopecia, indicating this method can be used as a research tool to evaluate the effects of therapeutic or cosmetic agents The next year, together with Malgorzata Olszewska and their co-workers she introduced the term trichoscopy for hair, scalp, eyebrows and eyelashes dermoscopy (videodermoscopy). Their subsequent studies showed this technique can easily replace traditional microscopic evaluation in genetic hair shaft abnormalities such as Netherton syndrome, monilethrix, wooly hair syndrome, pili torti, pili annulati and trichothiodystrophy. It has also been proved trichoscopy can be useful in diagnosing acquired hair diseases including androgenic alopecia, alopecia areata, cicatrical alopecia and tinea.

Rudnicka and her co-workers were the first to apply in vivo confocal laser scanning microscopy in hair diagnostics. Their studies showed potential usefulness of this method in evaluation of hair shaft diseases.

Lidia Rudnicka, together with Malgorzata Olszewska and Adriana Rakowska, has written the first Atlas of Trichoscopy, which was translated to multiple languages, including Chinese, Russian, Portuguese and Polish and is considered by some dermatologists the main trichoscopy textbook.

=== Melanoma prevention ===
Rudnicka is the organizer of a Polish nationwide campaign to promote prevention and early detection of melanoma (with dermoscopy and videodermoscopy). The campaign "Stop-Melanoma", based on highly successful Australian experience, is an ongoing program which started in 2004.

=== Antibiotic therapy of inflammatory skin diseases ===
Clinical observations made by Rudnicka and her co-workers indicate the rationality of long-term low-dose antibiotic therapy in chronic inflammatory skin diseases: SLE and psoriasis.

== Affiliations and activity in scientific societies ==
In 2014 Rudnicka was elected the president of the Polish Dermatological Society. She served as secretary of the board of this society in the years 2004–2008. Since 2004 she has been a member of board of International Dermoscopy Society. Rudnicka was a member of International Committee of American Academy of Dermatology in the term 2008–2012, she served as member and then chairman of the Poster Exhibition Task Force (2012–2018). She was one of the co-initiators to transform the Task Force into a Work Group (in 2017) to include a higher number of experts in the poster evaluation process. In 2017 Rudnicka was one of the four founding members of the International Trichoscopy Society, together with Antonella Tosti, Rodrigo Pirmez and Daniel Asz Sigall. She was elected first president of the International Trichoscopy Society.

Rudnicka was invited speaker and / or plenary speaker at multiple dermatology meetings, including: American Academy of Dermatology, European Academy of Dermatology and Venerology, (topics included: hair diseases, dermoscopy and skin cancer detection, psoriasis, psoriatic arthritis, biological therapy in skin diseases, connective tissue diseases, acne, clinical trials).

Lidia Rudnicka is honorary member of several medical societies, including the Russian Hair Research Society, Ukrainian Hair Research Society, and Mexican Hair Research Society.

== Honours ==
- Bronze Cross of Merit (2000)
- Silver Cross of Merit (2011)

== Publications and editorial activity ==
Rudnicka is author or co-author of more than 200 articles and book chapters, mainly concerning autoimmune skin diseases, biological therapies, videodermoscopy, trichoscopy, epidemiology of skin diseases and managing medical institutions.

Rudnicka is managing editor of "Journal of Case Reports in Dermatology", former chairman of scientific board of "Dermatologica", associate editor of "Journal of the European Academy of Dermatology and Venereology", member of scientific and editorial boards of Journal of Drugs in Dermatology, Przeglad Dermatologiczny, and Dermatologia Estetyczna. She also reviews papers for significant periodicals in the field of dermatology and venerology, with Archives of Dermatology, Journal of European Academy of Dermatology and Venereology, Journal of Drugs in Dermatology, and Expert Review in Dermatology among them.

== Selected publications ==
- Majewski S, Malejczyk J, Jablonska S, Misiewicz J, Rudnicka L, Obalek S, Orth G.:.Natural cell-mediated cytotoxicity against various target cells in patients with epidermodysplasia verruciformis. J Am Acad Dermatol. 1990, 22, 423–427.
- Majewski S, Hunzelmann N, Nischt R, Eckes B, Rudnicka L, Orth G, Krieg T, Jablonska S.:TGF beta-1 and TNF alpha expression in the epidermis of patients with epidermodysplasia verruciformis. J Invest Dermatol. 1991, 97, 862–867.
- Rudnicka L, Marczak M, Szmurło A, Makieła B, Skiendzielewska A, Skopinska M, Majewski S, Jabłonska S.: Acitretin decreases tumor cell-induced angiogenesis. Skin Pharmacol. 1991, 4, 150–153.
- Rudnicka L, Majewski S, Blaszczyk M, Skiendzielewska A, Makiela B, Skopinska M, Jablonska S.:Adhesion of peripheral blood mononuclear cells to vascular endothelium in patients with systemic sclerosis (scleroderma). Arthritis Rheum. 1992, 35, 771–775
- Mauviel A, Chen YQ, Kähäri VM, Ledo I, Wu M, Rudnicka L, Uitto J: Human recombinant interleukin -1 beta up=regulates elastin gene expression in derma fibroblasts. Evidence for transcriptional regulation in vitro and in vivo. J Biol Chem. 1993, 268, 6520–6524
- Rudnicka L, Varga J, Christiano AM, Iozzo RV, Jimenez SA, Uitto J.:Elevated expression of type VII collagen in the skin of patients with systemic sclerosis. Regulation by transforming growth factor-beta.J Clin Invest. 1994, 93, 1709–1715
- Varga J, Rudnicka L, Uitto J.: Connective tissue alterations in systemic sclerosis. Clin Dermatol. 1994, 12, 387–396
- Tamai K, Li K, Silos S, Rudnicka L, Hashimoto T, Nishikawa T, Uitto J (1995). "Interferon-gamma-mediated inactivation of transcription of the 230-kDa bullous pemphigoid antigen gene (BPAG1) provides novel insight into keratinocyte differentiation". J Biol Chem. 270 (1): 392–396. doi:10.1074/jbc.270.1.392. PMID 7814399.
- Hitraya EG, Tan EM, Rudnicka L, Jimenez SA (1995). "Expression of extracellular matrix genes in adult human dermal microvascular endothelial cells and their regulation by heparin and endothelial cell mitogens". Lab Invest. 73: 393–402. PMID 7564272.
- Rudnicka L, Czuwara J, Barusińska A, Nowicka U, Makieła B, Jabłonska S (1996). "Implications for the use of topoisomerase I inhibitors in treatment of patients with systemic sclerosis". Ann N Y Acad Sci. 803: 318–320. Bibcode:1996NYASA.803..318R. doi:10.1111/j.1749-6632.1996.tb26405.x. PMID 8993528.
- Czuwara-Ladykowska J, Makiela B, Smith EA, Trojanowska M, Rudnicka L. "The inhibitory effects of camptothecin, a topoisomerase I inhibitor, on collagen synthesis in fibroblasts from patients with systemic sclerosis". Arthritis Res. 2001 (3): 311–318.
- Olszewska M., Rudnicka L. (2005). "Effective treatment of female androgenic alopecia with dutasteride". J Drugs Dermatol. 4 (5): 637–640. PMID 16167423.
- Czuwara-Ladykowska J., Sicińska J., Olszewska M., Uhrynowska-Tyszkiewicz I., Rudnicka L "Prolactin synthesis by lymphocytes from patients with systemic sclerosis. Biomed Pharmacother 2006' 60(4), 152–155
- Rudnicka L, Olszewska M, Rakowska A, Kowalska-Oledzka E, Slowinska M (2008). "Trichoscopy: a new method for diagnosing hair loss". J Drugs Dermatol. 7: 651–654.
- Olszewska M, Rudnicka L, Rakowska A, Kowalska-Oledzka E, Slowinska M (2008). "Trichoscopy". Arch Dermatol. 144 (8): 1007. doi:10.1001/archderm.144.8.1007. PMID 18711072.
- Walicka M, Majsterek M, Rakowska A, Słowińska M, Sicińska J, Góralska B, Ptasińska M, Rudnicka L, Marcinowska-Suchowierska E (2008). "Mycoplasma pneumoniae-induced pneumonia with Stevens-Johnson syndrome of acute atypical course". Pol Arch Med Wewn. 118 (7–8): 449–53.
- Traczewski P, Rudnicka L (2008). "Adalimumab in dermatology". Br J Clin Pharmacol. 66 (5): 618–25. doi:10.1111/j.1365-2125.2008.03263.x. PMC 2661976. PMID 18754844.
- Sicińska J, Górska E, Cicha M, Kuklo-Kowalska A, Hamze V, Stepien K, Wasik M, Rudnicka (2008). "Increased serum fractalkine in systemic sclerosis. Down-regulation by prostaglandin E1". Clin Exp Rheumatol. 26: 527–33.
- Sicińska J, Rudnicka L (2008). "Current treatment of systemic sclerosis. Part I. Immunosuppressive treatment". Pol Merkur Lek. 25: 192–195. PMID 18942346.
- Sicińska J, Rudnicka L (2008). "[Current treatment of systemic sclerosis. Part II. Vascular and antifibrotic treatment]". Pol Merkur Lek. 25: 196–200. PMID 18942347.
- Rakowska A, Slowinska M, Kowalska-Oledzka E, Olszewska M, Czuwara J, Rudnicka L (2009). "Alopecia areata incognita: true or false?". J Am Acad Dermatol. 60 (1): 162–3. doi:10.1016/j.jaad.2008.07.062. PMID 19103371.
- Slowinska M, Rudnicka L, Schwartz RA, Kowalska-Oledzka E, Rakowska A, Sicinska J, Lukomska M, Olszewska M, Szymanska E (Nov 2008). "Comma hairs: a dermatoscopic marker for tinea capitis: a rapid diagnostic method". J Am Acad Dermatol. 59 (5 Suppl): S77–9. doi:10.1016/j.jaad.2008.07.009. PMID 19119131.
- Olszewska M., Wu J., Słowińska M., Rudnicka (2009). ""PDA" Nail: Traumatic Nail Dystrophy in Habitual Users of Personal Digital Assistants". Am J Clin Dermatol. 10 (3): 193–196. doi:10.2165/00128071-200910030-00006. PMID 19354334.
- Walecka I, Olszewska M, Rakowska A, Slowinska M, Sicinska J, Piekarczyk E, Kowalska-Oledzka E, Goralska B, Rudnicka L (2009). "Improvement of psoriasis after antibiotic therapy with cefuroxime axetil". J Eur Acad Dermatol Venereol. doi:10.1111/j.1468-3083.2009.03145 (inactive 6 October 2025). PMID 19368618.
- Rakowska A., Kowalska-Olędzka E., Słowińska M., Rosińska D., Rudnicka L. (2009). "Hair shaft videodrmoscopy in Netherton syndrome". Pediatr Dermatol. 26 (3): 320–2. doi:10.1111/j.1525-1470.2008.00778.x. PMID 19706096.
