= Woolly hair =

Medical condition

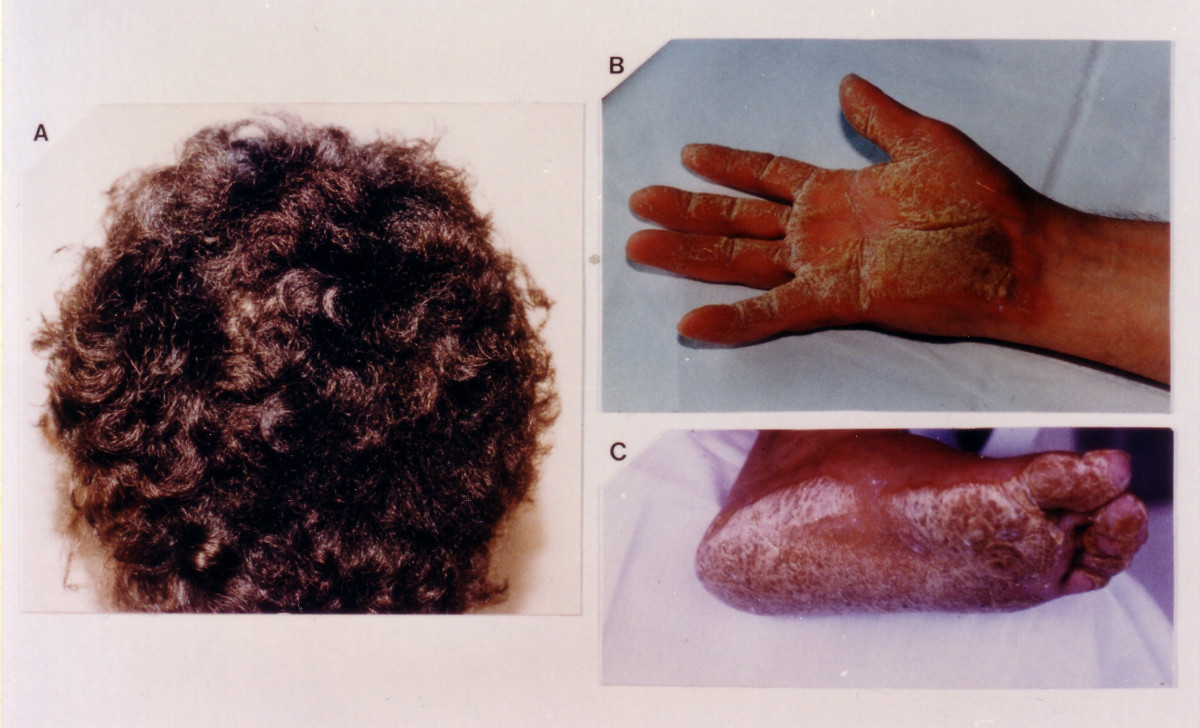
- Woolly hair and other symptoms of Naxos syndrome
- Symptoms: Hair: difficult to brush, tight locks, short, lighter colour
- Usual onset: Birth, infancy
- Types: Familial, hereditary, woolly hair nevus
- Risk factors: May run in families
- Diagnostic method: Microscopy, trichoscopy, dermoscopy, electron microscopy
- Prognosis: May improve with age
- Frequency: Rare

Woolly hair is a difficult to brush hair, usually present since birth and typically most severe in childhood. It has extreme curls and kinks, occurs in black people and is distinct from kinky hair. The hairs come together to form tight locks, unlike in kinky hair, where the hairs remain individual. Woolly hair can be generalised over the whole scalp, when it tends to run in families, or it may involve just part of the scalp as in woolly hair nevus.

The presence of woolly hair may indicate other problems such as with the heart in Naxos–Carvajal syndrome. Diagnosis is suspected by its general appearance and confirmed by scanning electron microscopy.

The condition is rare. Alfred Milne Gossage coined the term woolly hair in 1908. Edgar Anderson distinguished woolly hair from kinky hair in 1936.

== Discovery ==
Alfred Milne Gossage coined the term woolly hair to describe the sign in 18 members in three or four generations of a European family in Lowestoft, England, in 1908. He thought it resembled kinky hair, possibly from a Mexican ancestor in that family. He described a dominant inheritance in several members with thick skin of palms and soles, curly hair, and two different coloured eyes, and sent them to William Bateson. Edgar Anderson distinguished woolly hair from Afro-hair in 1936. In 1974 Hutchinson's team classified woolly hair as hereditary woolly hair (autosomal dominant), familial woolly hair (autosomal recessive), and woolly hair nevus. Woolly hair was found in Naxos syndrome, first described in 1986 in Naxos, Greece, and was noted in Carvajal syndrome, first described in 1998, in Ecuador.

== Cause ==
Woolly hair may run in families and either occur on its own, or as part of a syndrome.

=== Hereditary woolly hair ===
Autosomal dominant and recessive

Hereditary woolly hair is autosomal dominant.

=== Familial woolly hair ===
Familial woolly hair is autosomal recessive. It may be part of a syndrome such as Naxos syndrome, due to passing on of mutations in the JUP gene. When part of Carvajal syndrome, it is due the passing of mutations of the Desmoplakin gene. The two syndromes caused by two different genes, are considered as one entity; Naxos–Carvajal syndrome.

=== Woolly hair nevus ===
The woolly hair of a woolly hair nevus is in a circumscribed area of the scalp, appears in infancy and does not run in families. It likely represents a mosaic RASopathy.

== Signs and symptoms ==
Woolly hair is typically very curly, kinky and characteristically impossible to brush. It can be generalised over the whole scalp, or involve just part of the scalp, and occurs in non-black people. The hairs come together to form tight locks, whereas in kinky hair the hairs remain individual. The hairs typically remain shorter than 12 centimetres (4.7 in) and may be slightly lighter in colour.

Woolly hair nevus is a localised area of woolly hair, which may occur on its own, or appear as dark twisted and kinking hair in an adult. Half of people with woolly hair nevus have a warty skin lesion on the same side of the body. It may be associated with eye problems such as two different coloured eyes or strands of tissue across the pupil of the eye. Other associations include ear problems, kidney disease, tooth decay, impairment of bone growth, and skin lesions.

Generalised woolly hair is typically seen in Naxos–Carvajal syndrome (with heart involvement), Noonan syndrome, and cardiofaciocutaneous syndrome.

== Diagnosis ==
Diagnosis is suspected by its general appearance and confirmed by scanning electron microscopy. Microscopy, trichoscopy and dermoscopy also play a role. The hair strand typically has a smaller diameter, is ovoid on cross-section and exhibits abnormal twisting. The hair shaft also has weak points and alternating dark and light bands. The hair shaft is characteristically of a "snake crawl appearance". Dermoscopy may be required to recognise skin signs.

== Outcome ==
The condition may improve in adulthood.

== Epidemiology ==
The condition is rare.

== See also ==
- Uncombable hair syndrome
