= First Derm =

First Derm is a US-based online dermatology and tele-health website providing answers to skin conditions. Users send in cases to board certified dermatologists via an iOS, Android or Web app.

== History ==
First Derm was founded in 2014 by Dr. Alexander Börve to support dermatologists in treating patients online. Dr. Börve studied at the Sahlgrenska Academy based in The University of Gothenburg, where he was a researcher in mobile health and tele-dermatology. The research conducted was one of the first of its time, based on using mobile devices as a tool to answer questions and queries for dermatologists. The research included a pilot study of the effectiveness of a mobile health service in Sweden, the use of MMS and SMS in teledermatology, and the use of teledermoscopy as a tool to refer possible skin cancer patients to a dermatologist.

Over 300,000 cases have been checked from over 160 countries and the service is available in seven languages.

== Purpose ==
The purpose of First Derm is to provide immediate solutions to skin care concerns without diagnosing the patient. This allows the patient to speed up the referral process and receive surgery or treatment more quickly than the traditional route.

The tool is also used by national health services such as NHSx who employ the tool as a triage solution for doctors.
