= Teledermatology =

Subspecialty of dermatology

Teledermatology is a subspecialty in the medical field of dermatology and probably one of the most common applications of telemedicine and e-health. In teledermatology, telecommunication technologies are used to exchange medical information (concerning skin conditions and tumours of the skin) over a distance using audio, visual, and data communication. Applications comprise health care management such as diagnoses, consultation, and treatment as well as (continuous) education.

The dermatologists Perednia and Brown were the first to coin the term "teledermatology" in 1995. In a scientific publication, they described the value of a teledermatologic service in a rural area underserved by dermatologists.

== Modes of data transmission ==
Teledermatology (as telemedicine) is practised on the basis of two concepts: Store and forward (SAF) and real time/live interactive teledermatology. Hybrid modes also exist (combining SAF and real time applications).

The SAF method is most commonly used in teledermatology: It involves sending (forwarding) digital images associated with (anonymous) medical information to the data storage unit of a consulted specialist. It can be as easy as sending an email with a digital image of a lesion to seek advice for a skin condition. Advantages of this method are that it does not demand the presence of both parties at the same time and does not usually require expensive equipment.

In real-time/ live interactive teledermatology applications, provider and individuals usually interact via live videoconferencing. It may also involve remote surgery and the use of telerobotic microscopes in dermatopathology. This mode generally requires more sophisticated and costly technology than used in the SAF mode. Both participants must be available at the same time.

== Areas of application ==
=== Health care management ===
There is insufficient evidence to support teledermatology in diagnosing and triaging patients for specialist care. Therefore, more studies are needed to determine its effectiveness.

Direct consultation involves an individual with a skin condition contacting a dermatologist via telecommunication to request diagnosis and treatment. In this field, mobile applications of teledermatology gain importance.

Telediagnosis in the absence of personal contact with health care workers to the individual is complex. It requires active participation of the individual and without appropriate guidance may lead to improper management. However, as a triage tool, leading the individual directly to the appropriate specialist for his/her disease, could be very valuable in the near future.

Specialist referral is a major area of application in teledermatology A general practitioner (or other medical professional) that sees the individual consults a specialist/ specialised centre via telecommunication to get a second opinion. The specialist then helps the GP in rendering a diagnosis, providing management options et cetera.

Home telehealth/telehomecare involves an individual with a chronic condition being examined and managed remotely at home. An important field of interest of telehomecare in dermatology is the follow-up treatment of individuals with skin conditions requiring regular follow-up such as crural ulcers or psoriasis management. Crural ulcers are a common skin condition that needs follow up visits up to twice a week demanding significant time commitments by the individuals in addition to causing a financial burden on the health care system. Psoriasis is experienced by 3.2% of adults in the United States, and emerging research on teledermatology treatment of this condition suggests increased access to specialty care with positive patient satisfaction, outcomes, and cost savings.

=== Education and information ===
Medical education/continuous education are a major advantage of telemedicine/e-health. Numerous universities offer online courses, computer-based training and Web applications in this field principally aimed at medical students. Specialist training courses via internet are also available, particularly in dermoscopy.

General medical/health information may be accessed by non-professionals, such as individuals affected by a skin condition, and their relatives, through the internet. They are also able to join peer support groups with others affected by the same condition.

== Domains with special interest ==
=== Teledermoscopy ===
In teledermoscopy, digital dermoscopic lesion images (with or without clinical images) are transmitted electronically to a specialist for examination. This can be done on the web-based telediagnostic network Campus Medicus.

Dermoscopy (dermatoscopy, epiluminescence microscopy) is the technical field of using an epiluminescence microscope for viewing skin lesions in magnification in-vivo. It is particularly useful in the early detection of malignant skin lesions (i.e., melanoma). Digital dermoscopic images can be taken with a digital camera attached to a dermatoscope or special video cameras suited for dermoscopy, e.g. the Fotofinder. Since dermoscopy is based on examination of a two-dimensional image it is very well suited for digital imaging and teledermatology.

=== Teledermatopathology ===
Teledermatopathology is the transmission of dermatopathologic images either in real-time with the aid of a robotic microscope or using a store-and-forward system (transmission as a single file). In the latter method (SAF) a rather new development is the introduction of virtual slide systems (VSS).

Virtual slides are made by digitally scanning an entire glass slide at a high resolution and then sending the images to a storage system. These can be then assessed on a computer screen similar to conventional microscopy, allowing the pathologist to maneuver around the image and view every part of the slide at any magnification.

=== Teledermoscopically aided dermatopathology ===
This is the transmission of crucial medical data and dermoscopic as well as clinical images to a pathologist who renders the conventional histopathologic diagnosis.

In the everyday clinical setting, skin biopsies are taken by the physician directly responsible for the individual and are assessed by a dermatopathologist. This pathologist has most likely never seen the clinical aspect of the lesion and might not have any information about the person. These limitations can be overcome by teledermoscopically aided dermatopathology whereby a patient history and clinical data may increase the sensitivity of diagnosis.

Additionally it has been shown that provision of such data may improve the level of diagnostic confidence held by the assessing dermatopathologists.

=== Mobile teledermatology ===
Mobile telemedicine is a system in which at least one participant (the person seeking advice or the doctor, for instance) uses wireless or mobile equipment (i.e. mobile phones, handheld devices), in contrast to conventional stationary telemedicine platforms. Travellers who develop skin lesions as well as doctors who are on the move in hospital/non-hospital area can benefit from this new development in teledermatology. To facilitate access to medical advice and enable individuals to play a more active role in managing their own health status, mobile teledermatology seems to be especially suited for patient filtering or triage. (i.e. referral based on the severity and character of their skin condition). Another possible practical application is for follow-up of individuals with chronic skin conditions. However, currently available studies show a high rate of missed skin cancers including melanoma, and there is not enough robust data to recommend this method of diagnosis.

=== Suitability of cases ===
Not all cases are suitable for teledermatology. The type of cases suited for teledermatology is a topic, which requires more studies. Some studies have observed that eczema and follicular lesions were diagnosed with relatively more certainty, while in some other studies it was seen that diagnoses were made with more certainty in cases like viral warts, herpes zoster, acne vulgaris, irritant dermatitis, vitiligo, and superficial bacterial and fungal infections. Unlike in western studies where pigmented lesions suspicious of melanomas are one of the most referred cases for teledermatology (with or without teledermatoscopy), Asian studies have fewer cases referred based on the suspicion of melanoma.

== Implemented projects by country ==
=== United Kingdom ===
24% of the population in England and Wales seek medical advice for a skin condition, and approximately 6% of patients presenting with a skin problem are referred for specialist advice each year.

The Department of Health encourages the use of digital technology in key areas to support delivery of the quality, innovation, productivity, and prevention (QIPP). This includes the introduction of digital or online services to deliver greater convenience for patients and to free up face-to-face clinical time for individuals who really need it.

=== Brazil ===
Brazil has had a high influx of white-skinned European immigrants from Portugal, Spain, Italy, Austria, Germany, Poland, Russia, etc., for many centuries. High ultraviolet content of solar exposure of skin leads to a high prevalence of lesions, especially skin cancer, with almost 200,000 diagnosed cases per year (30% of call cancer cases in the country). Teledermatology and teledermoscopy services both at the level of public and private medicine have been implemented since 2005 in almost all states, particularly in Southern states where prevalence is higher. The Ministry of Health and the state's Health Secretaries have funded several initiatives within the framework of the Brazilian Primary Care Telehealth Program, such as in the state of Santa Catarina, where all municipalities have access to a teledermatology diagnosis and triage system headed by the Federal University of Santa Catarina In the private sector, several initiatives have also taken place, such as a joint effort by the Albert Einstein Israelite Hospital of São Paulo's Telemedicine Center and the Municipal Health Secretary to provide teledermatology services to public health units, and was very useful to reduce queues, prioritize and expedite care for the more urgent cases of cancer care. In addition, several private telemedicine services and startups experienced growth during the COVID-19 pandemic in the country.

=== Australia ===
Teledermatology and teledermoscopy currently exist in different forms in Australia. They assist with combatting the high skin cancer rates and allows rural patients to access specialist advice without having to travel. However, store-and-forward teledermatology or teledermoscopy are not currently funded under the Australian national health scheme called Medicare. Research has been done into the economic impact of funding teledermoscopy in the Australian setting, finding that it would cost around $2 for every day that diagnosis or treatment was expedited. Australian dermatologists have been reported as reflecting on teledermoscopy by saying "that it is valuable, [and] advanced dermatology service" but given the option "they would prefer face-to-face consultation with patients where possible to allow for a full body examination".

== See also ==
- List of cutaneous conditions
