= Antonella Tosti =

Italian physician

Antonella Tosti is an Italian physician and scientist with major contributions in the field of dermatology, including developing dermoscopy for the diagnosis and care of hair diseases. She is a world recognized expert in hair disorders. Her contributions to knowledge about nails include research about videodermoscopy of the hyponychium and the nail plate.

Dr. Tosti is the medical resident advisor for DS Healthcare Group and the Fredric Brandt Endowed Professor of Dermatology and Cutaneous Surgery at the University of Miami's Miller School of Medicine. She is also head of the Monat Scientific Advisory Board, and the editor in chief of Skin Appendage Disorders, a medical journal dedicated to hair and other skin appendages, and a regional editor for the International Journal of Trichology.

== Education ==
Tosti became interested in hair biology during high school, after meeting a family friend, Dr. William Montagna, who was a pioneer on the study of the hair follicle. She eventually went on to complete medical school and training in dermatology at the University of Bologna in Italy.

== Career ==
After becoming a dermatologist, Tosti started a clinic at the University of Bologna in 1982, the first hair clinic in the world. In 1989, she co-founded the European Hair Research Society (EHRS).

Tosti started her academic career in Bologna as a full Professor of Dermatology, before moving to Miami in 2010. In 2017, she received the Fredric Brandt Endowment for $1 million.

She is the author of Dermoscopy of Hair and Scalp Disorders, the first hair and scalp dermoscopy (trichoscopy) atlas ever published. Her major contributions to international medicine include research related to various aspects of hair diseases. A new hair disorder described by Tosti is often referred to as "Tosti Alopecia".

Tosti is the author or co-author of several dermatological monographs and book chapters, including an e-medicine chapter about contact stomatitis. Topics of books she has authored include fungal nail infections (onychomycosis).

Tosti is the author of nearly 700 scientific publications, 600 peer-reviewed papers and the editor or co-editor of 30 books. She is a secretary and treasurer of the North American Hair Research Society and of the World Trichoscopy Society. Tosti is a mentee of the Women's Dermatologic Society mentorship award and has presented at conferences and lectures in more than 20 different countries. She is a founding member and past president of the European Nail Society, past president and member of Board of Directors of the Council of Nail Disorders, and founder and president of the International Academy of Trichology.
