= Gossage (disambiguation) =

Gossage is a family of soapmakers.

Gossage may also refer to:

== People with the surname ==
- Alfred Milne Gossage (1864–1948), British doctor and dean of Westminster Hospital
- Alice Gossage (1861–1929), American journalist and activist
- Beverly Gossage (born 1950), American politician
- Eddie Gossage (1958–2024), American public speaker; former president of Texas Motor Speedway
- Gene Gossage (1935–2011), American and Canadian gridiron football player
- Goose Gossage (born 1951), American baseball player
- Howard Gossage (1917–1979), American advertising innovator
- John Gossage (born 1946), American photographer
- Leslie Gossage (1891–1949), officer in the British Army and Royal Air Force
- Lucy Gossage (born 1979), British doctor and former triathlete
- Peter Gossage (1946–2016), New Zealand author and illustrator
- Star Gossage (born 1973), New Zealand artist
- Tim Gossage (born 1965), Australian sports journalist
- William Gossage (1799–1877), British chemist and businessman, and founder of Gossage soap company

== Other ==
- Gossage Cup, an African football tournament now called CECAFA Cup
- Gossage Creek, a tributary of the Washoe Creek
- Gossage River, a tributary of the Mackenzie River

== See also ==
- Charles Gossage Grey (1894–1987), American WWI flying ace
