= Julie Ann Sosa =

American surgeon

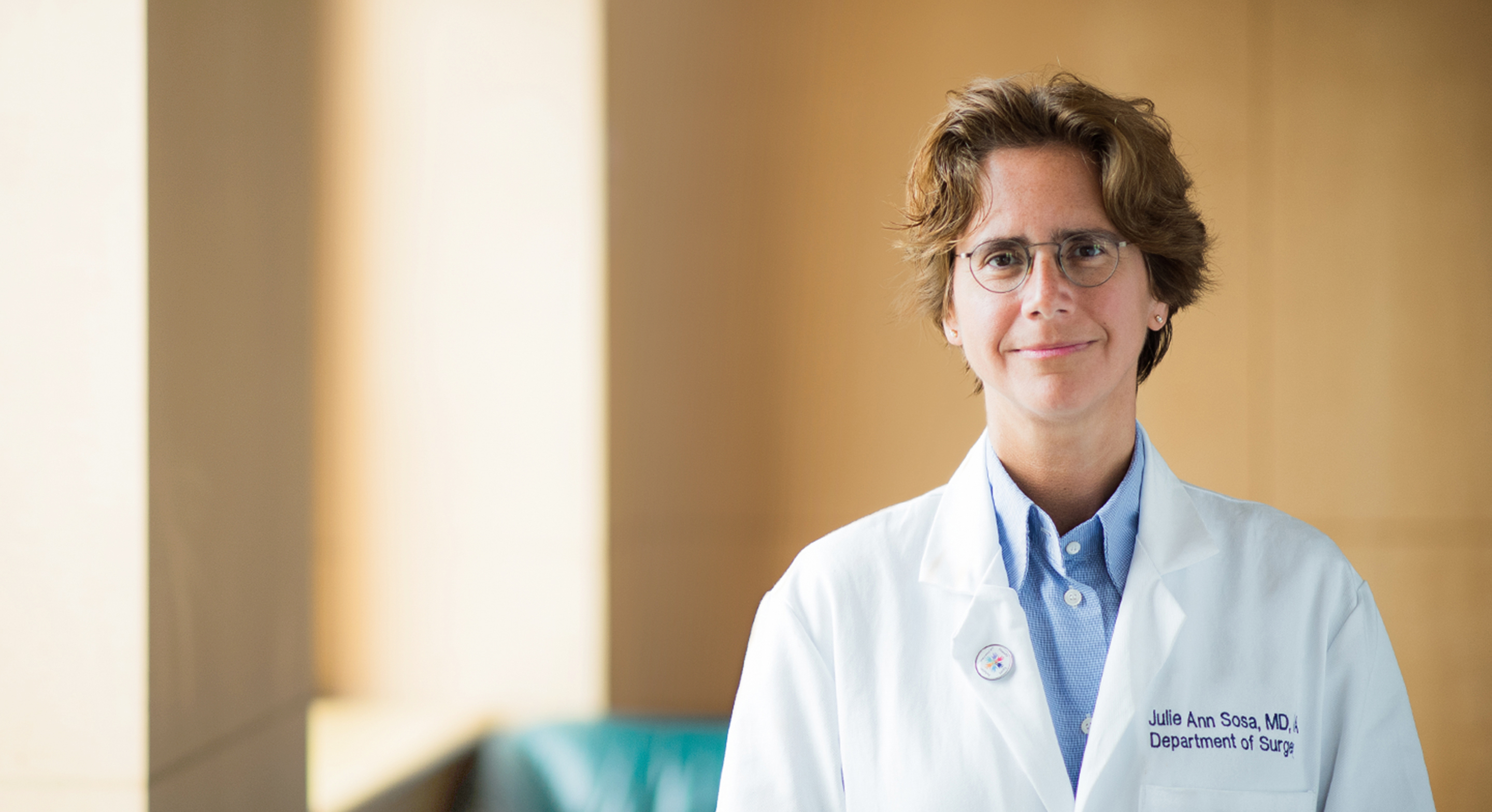
- Dr. Sosa at UCSF in 2018
- Born: August 14th, 1966 (age 59) Montreal, Quebec, Canada
- Education: Bethlehem Central High School, Princeton University (Bachelor of Arts); Worcester College, Oxford (Master of Arts); Johns Hopkins University School of Medicine (Doctor of Medicine)
- Occupations: Endocrine surgeon and Scientist
- Years active: 2002–present

Julie Ann Sosa is the Chair of the Department of Surgery at the University of California, San Francisco (UCSF), where she is also a Professor of Medicine and affiliated faculty at the Philip R. Lee Institute for Health Policy Studies. Sosa holds the Leon Goldman, MD, Distinguished Professorship in Surgery. Sosa served as President of the American Thyroid Association from 2022 to 2023 and chairs the committee responsible for developing its next differentiated thyroid cancer guidelines. Today, she serves as the Treasurer of the American Thyroid Association. She is Editor of Greenfield’s Surgery: Scientific Principles and Practice and previously served as Editor-in-Chief of the World Journal of Surgery.

Sosa is an American endocrine surgeon and surgical oncologist, specializing in thyroid cancer. She is internationally recognized for her work in health services research, demonstrating for the first time in the United States a strong association between a higher surgeon or hospital case volume and improved patient outcomes following thyroidectomy and pancreatectomy, as well as optimal extent of thyroid surgery and lymphadenectomy for thyroid cancer. Her contributions have led to the revision of practice guidelines for the management of patients with endocrine diseases. In August 2025, Dr. Sosa co-chaired the newly published 2025 American Thyroid Association management guidelines for adult patients with differentiated thyroid cancer, alongside Dr. Matthew Ringel, of The Ohio State University. Published in Thyroid, the guidelines emphasize patient-centered care, shared decision-making, and evidence-based strategies to improve outcomes.

== Education and previous appointments ==
Sosa received her medical degree from Johns Hopkins University School of Medicine in 1994 and went on to complete the Halsted Residency in Surgery at Johns Hopkins in 2001, followed by a fellowship in Surgical Oncology as Assistant Chief of Service in 2002. She was a Robert Wood Johnson Clinical Scholar from 1996 to 1998.

In 2002, Sosa joined the Yale School of Medicine as an assistant professor of surgery, reaching the rank of associate professor in 2008. While at Yale, Sosa led the Clinical Research Program in Endocrine Cancers at Smilow Cancer Hospital at Yale New Haven. In 2012, Sosa joined the Duke University School of Medicine as Professor of Surgery and Medicine (Oncology) where she remained until April 2018 when she became chair of the UCSF Department of Surgery. In 2020, she was formally inducted into The American College of Surgeons Academy of Master Educators.

== Scientific contributions ==
An NIH- and FDA-funded investigator, she has authored or edited seven books and published more than 400 peer-reviewed articles and 80 book chapters, with a focus on thyroid cancer, parathyroid disease, and health services research. Dr. Sosa's research has focused on identifying ways to optimize patient outcomes following surgery and focused in the arena of endocrine neoplasia, with a particular interest in thyroid cancer. She also has been actively involved in clinical trials focused on the development of novel therapies for the management of locally advanced and metastatic thyroid cancer; she was active in early work developing vandetanib for medullary thyroid cancer (JCO 2010) and exploring vascular disrupting agent for anaplastic thyroid cancer (Thyroid 2014). Most recently, she has worked together with Dr Libby Grubbs at the University of Texas MD Anderson Cancer Center to develop a first of kind multi-institutional registry studying the natural history of a rare disease, medullary thyroid cancer (JMIR Form Res 2021). Her scholarship has been supported by the National Institutes of Health, the Food and Drug Administration, the Connecticut Stem Cell Fund, the American Geriatrics Society, the Donoghue Medical Research Foundation, and the Association for Academic Surgery.

Her transdisciplinary research group, which includes surgeons, endocrinologists, biostatisticians, epidemiologists, health economists, health services researchers, basic scientists and stem cell researchers, has made discoveries that have helped define optimal extent of surgery for differentiated thyroid cancer (JCEM 2015, Ann Surg 2014) and what constitutes an adequate lymphadenectomy (JCO 2016); a minimum volume threshold of thyroidectomies to optimize outcomes (Ann Surg 2016); survival benefit afforded by adjuvant RAI for intermediate risk DTC (JCEM 2015); explanations for the increasing incidence of thyroid cancer (Nature Rev 2016; JAMA 2017); improved staging systems for thyroid cancer (JCO 2016); and the potential association between thyroid cancer and flame retardants (Environment International 2017). Practice guidelines have changed as a result (Thyroid 2016). She is currently co-chairing the committee writing the next iteration of American Thyroid Association practice guidelines for adult patients with differentiated thyroid cancer.

Dr. Sosa is a tireless advocate for initiatives and scholarship around diversity, equity, and inclusion in academic surgery. She has assembled a large body of scholarship based on the National Study of Expectations and Attitudes of Residents in Surgery (NEARS) survey, the results of which were first reported in JAMA 2009. Since that time, many other findings have been reported out by Drs Heather Yeo and Sosa, describing expectations and attitudes of interns and residents toward their training, ultimately trying to understand reasons for the high attrition rates observed in general surgery postgraduate training. Most recently, their research group reported on the association of demographic and program factors with American Board of Surgery qualifying and certifying examinations pass rates (JAMA Surgery 2020).

== Professional memberships and awards ==
In recognition for her scientific contributions, Sosa has been elected into professional societies and has been honored with awards over the years, a few of which are listed below:

=== Societies ===
- Elected Member of the American Surgical Association
- Member of the Association for Academic Surgery
- Treasurer of the American Thyroid Association
- Elected Member of the American Association of Endocrine Surgeons
- Chair, Finance and Audit Committee, and Member, Board of Directors of the International Thyroid Oncology Group
- Elected Member of the Society of Clinical Surgery
- Elected Member of the Halsted Society

=== Honors ===
- Fellow, AAMC Council of Deans Fellowship Program (2023–2024)
- Distinguished Service Award, ATA (2022)
- Chancellor’s Award for Diversity – Advancement of Women, UCSF (2022)
- Elected full Member, Academy of Master Surgeon Educators, American College of Surgeons (MAMSE)
- Research Career Development Award, Claude D. Pepper Center at Yale
- JJ Roslyn Faculty Research Award, Association for Academic Surgery
- Association for Academic Surgery International Visiting Professorship Award
- Johns Hopkins Society of Scholars, Johns Hopkins University
- Distinguished Alumna Award, Johns Hopkins University
- Woman of the Year in Thyroidology 2017, American Thyroid Association
- Lewis E. Braverman Distinguished Lectureship Award, American Thyroid Association, 2017
- Hedwig van Ameringen Executive Leadership in Academic Medicine (ELAM) Class of 2016
