= Woolly hair nevus =

- Specialty: Medical genetics

Woolly hair nevus, alternatively spelled wooly hair nevus, is a congenital condition in which hair in a circumscribed area of the scalp is kinked or woolly.

== See also ==
- Woolly hair
- Naxos syndrome
