= Nikos Protonotarios =

Greek researcher and cardiologist

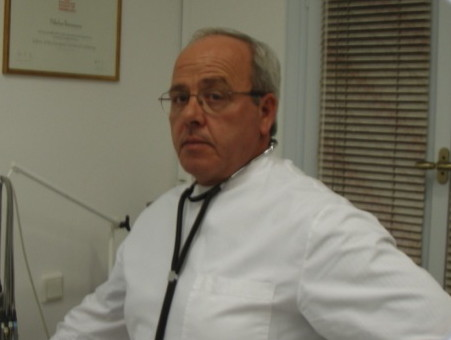
Dr. Nikos Protonotarios in 2012

Nikos Protonotarios (Naxos, 1 October 1956 – Athens, 25 September 2014) was a Greek researcher and cardiologist who made fundamental contributions to the field of arrhythmogenic myocardial diseases.

== Biography ==
He was born in Apeiranthos, Naxos, Greece. In 1981, he graduated at the top of his class from the Medical School of the National and Kapodistrian University of Athens. In 1983, he returned to his hometown, Naxos, where he fulfilled his Rural Medical Service.

During this period, along with his wife, Dr. Antigoni-Eleni Tsatsopoulou, he identified and studied the first cases of arrhythmogenic myocardial disease, which he later made known to the global medical community as "Naxos Disease" through his historic work in the international cardiology journal, British Heart Journal, in 1986.

== Contribution to cardiology ==
Protonotarios identified and described the myocardial disease "Naxos Disease", as well as the gene responsible for it. His work paved the way for the application of genetic science in the treatment of myocardial disease, marking the first time in the history of clinical cardiology that genetic science was applied to address a myocardial disease. His research on "Naxos Disease" not only led to the recognition of plakoglobin as a pathogenic gene for arrhythmogenic right ventricular cardiomyopathy (ARVC/D) but also opened the path for the discovery of other desmosomal genes related to the pathogenesis of the disease.

His work on plakoglobin formed the basis for the development of an innovative diagnostic test for identifying patients with ARVC/D , and later, it laid the groundwork for the discovery of a completely new drug, SB216763, which, in cellular models and genetically mutated experimental animals, eliminates all abnormalities associated with the disease.
