= William Montagna =

Italian-American biologist (1913–1994)

William Montagna (born Guglielmo Montagna, 6 July 1913, Roccacasale, Abruzzo, Italy – 16 November 1994, Hillsboro, Oregon) was an Italian-American biologist, known for his anatomical work in dermatology.

== Early life and education ==
In 1927 at the age of 13, Guglielmo Montagna, whose father was a skilled blacksmith, emigrated from Italy with his family to Buffalo, New York. At age 14 he became an American citizen and his first name was legally changed from "Guglielmo" to "William". In later years he recounted that his first year in the U.S.A. was difficult because "a scuola, non riuscivo a capire neppure una parole inglese" (at school I couldn't understand a single word of English). At Bethany College in West Virginia he graduated in 1936 with a bachelor's degree in biology and chemistry. At Cornell University he graduated in 1944 with a Ph.D. in zoology.

== Career ==
From 1944 to 1945 Montagna was an instructor in ornithology and zoology. From 1945 to 1948 he was an assistant professor at the Long Island College of Medicine (now part of SUNY Downstate Health Sciences University). In 1948 he joined the faculty of Brown University. There he became a full professor in 1952 and L. Herbert Ballou University Professor of Biology in 1960. He left Brown University in 1963 to become a professor and head of experimental biology at Portland's Oregon Health Sciences University (now named the Oregon Health & Science University) and director of Hillsboro's Oregon Regional Primate Research Center (now named the Oregon National Primate Research Center). He retired in 1980. He was the author or co-author of over 450 articles.

For the academic year 1969–1970 Montagna was the president of the Society for Investigative Dermatology (SDI). In 1972 he received the SDI's Stephen Rothman Award for achievement in investigative dermatology. In 1975 SDI established the annual William Montagna Lecture and he was honored with the Ordine al merito della Repubblica Italiana. At the University of Minnesota's Department of Medicine, he gave the 1975 Wesley Spink Memorial Lecture, entitled Non-human primates in biomedical research.

== Personal life ==
On September 1, 1939 in Canonsburg, Pennsylvania, William Montagna married Helen Fife (1916–2008). They had two daughters, Eleanor and Margaret, and two sons, John and James. the couple divorced in 1975. He would become a Grandfather to seven grandchildren: Maria, Anna, Anthony, Brandon, Makenzie, Maximilian, and Ludovica. William Montagna married his second wife in 1980.

Montagna was a family friend of fellow Italian-American Antonella Tosti whom he inspired in her youth to become a notable dermatologist as well.
