= Heine Optotechnik =

HEINE Optotechnik
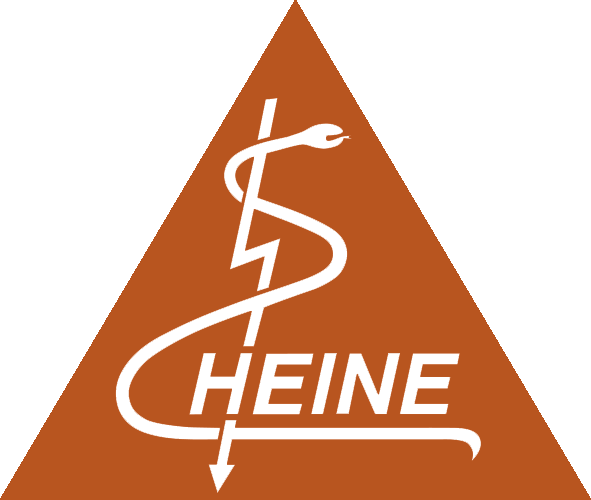
- Company type: GmbH & Co KG
- Industry: Medical Technology
- Founded: 1946
- Headquarters: Gilching, Germany
- Key people: Oliver Heine (President & CEO), Timo Martin (Chief Operations Officer)
- Number of employees: 500

HEINE Optotechnik is a manufacturer of medical diagnostic instruments and is based in Gilching, near Munich, Germany. The company was founded in 1946 by the German physicist Helmut A. Heine and has been a family run company ever since.

A characteristic of the company is that from the initial idea to the finished product, almost all of the critical production steps are carried out in-house to ensure the high quality of the instruments produced. The company specializes in otoscopes, ophthalmoscopes, dermatoscopes, binocular loupes, laryngoscopes, stethoscopes, proctological instruments, fiber-optic examination lights and hand-held slit lamps.

HEINE Optotechnik is represented in over 120 countries around the world, with subsidiaries in Australia, Canada, the US and Switzerland as well as 3,000 representatives, importers and specialist dealers.

== History ==
In HEINE & Co. Medizinisch-Physikalische Werkstätten GmbH, owner Helmut A. Heine initially manufactured otoscopes and direct ophthalmoscopes from 1946 (when he established the company). Many materials and commodities were in short supply in Germany, which was still being rebuilt at the time. Therefore, he improvised and used commodities that were available during the post-war turmoil to make the first diagnostic instrument: empty and thus sustainably recyclable cartridge cases.

In 2020 the entire company moved from its former headquarters in Herrsching to newly built corporate headquarters in Gilching, just outside Munich. All of the corporate divisions, such as Development, Tool Construction, Optics and other production-related divisions, not to mention Administration, are now located under the same roof in the new building.

== Quality system ==
HEINE has installed and maintains a documented quality system, which meet the international standards DIN EN ISO 9001, DIN EN ISO 13485 and the European Medical Device Regulations MDD 93/ 42 EEC.

== Awards ==
2019: A German traditional brand, HEINE Optotechnik was awarded the ‘German Standards – Brands of the Century’ seal in the Primary Diagnostic Instruments category.

2020: GOOD DESIGN® Award 2020 in the category ‚Medical‘ for the dermatoscopes DELTA 30 und DELTAone.

== Corporate social responsibility ==
HEINE signed the UN Global Compact and implements the UN's Ten Principles in the areas of human rights, labour standards, environmental protection and corruption prevention.

The company headquarters building in Gilching, south of Munich, is cooled in summer by a groundwater source heat pump and heated in winter by recovering energy from the waste heat generated from production machines. Greenery covers almost half of the site, as well as the roof.
