= Fotofinder =

FotoFinder is a worldwide brand for medical skin imaging systems. The German company FotoFinder Systems GmbH was founded in 1991 and has developed imaging solutions for the follow-up of skin lesions as well as hair disorders diagnostics (TrichoLAB) and psoriasis assessment.

== FotoFinder imaging technology ==
1. Digital dermatoscopy (also called digital epiluminescence microscopy) for monitoring skin lesions over time. Through the technology-based follow-up, changes of the skin and single lesions can be detected at an early stage where the chances of healing are high.
2. Analysis of skin lesions according to deep learning algorithms based on Artificial Intelligence. Therefore, the "Moleanalyzer pro" tool has been developed and validated in several clinical studies, one of them “Man against machine”. It supports doctors in the pre-assessment of melanocytic and non-melanocytic lesions.
3. Automated Total Body Mapping and Total Body Dermoscopy for monitoring the entire skin of patients with multiple lesions. All parts of the body are photographed from head to toe for a complete, systematic and standardized documentation.
4. Skin analyses to visualize new and changed moles. Therefore, the "Bodyscan" tool compares two total body photos with the help of complex algorithms. The first program version was the result of cooperation with the Fraunhofer Institute for Biomedical Engineering.

Each of the presented methods supports physicians in the early detection of skin changes and skin cancer. In an overall view, the diagnostic accuracy will be improved with the use of special cameras, expert software and scientific-based analysis systems.
