= Familial progressive hyperpigmentation =

- Other names: Melanosis universalis hereditaria
- This condition in inherited in an autosomal dominant manner
- Specialty: Medical genetics

Familial progressive hyperpigmentation is characterized by patches of hyperpigmentation, present at birth, which increase in size and number with age. This is a genetic disease, however the gene that accounts for this spotty darkening of the skin has yet to be discovered. Although rare, the congenital disease is most prevalent among populations originating from China.

== See also ==
- Skin lesion
