= Journal of the European Academy of Dermatology and Venereology =

- Discipline: Dermatology, venereology
- Language: English

Publication details
- History: 1991–present
- Publisher: John Wiley & Sons, Inc. on behalf of the European Academy of Dermatology and Venereology
- Frequency: Monthly
- Impact factor: 9.2 (2022)

Standard abbreviations
- ISO 4: J. Eur. Acad. Dermatol. Venereol.

Indexing
- ISSN: 1064-7554 (print); 1573-7055 (web)
- OCLC no.: 45265858

Links
- Journal homepage

The Journal of the European Academy of Dermatology and Venereology is the official journal of the European Academy of Dermatology and Venereology. The journal is peer-reviewed monthly that publishes articles of general and practical interest in the field of dermatology and venereology on clinical and basic science topics, as well as research with practical implications. According to the Journal Citation Reports, the journal has a 2022 impact factor of 9.2.
