= Trichoscopy =

Medical examination technique of the hair and scalp

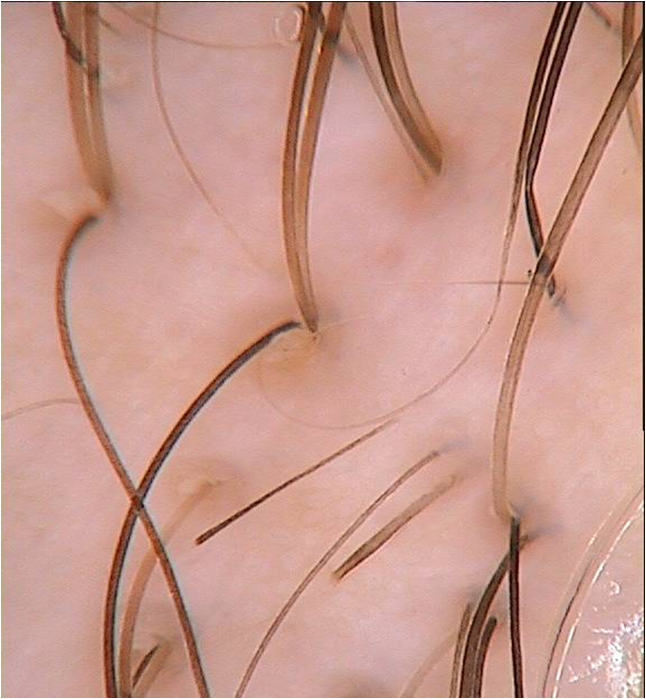
- Trichoscopy image of alopecia areata
- Purpose: Diagnose hair and scalp diseases

In dermatology, trichoscopy is a method of hair and scalp evaluation and is used for diagnosing their diseases. The method is based on dermoscopy. In trichoscopy, hair and scalp structures may be visualized at many-fold magnification. Currently magnifications ranging from 10-fold to 70-fold are most popular in research and clinical practice.

The method was developed by groups of dermatologists directed by: Lidia Rudnicka in Poland, Antonella Tosti and Giuseppe Micali in Italy, and Shigeki Inui in Japan. In 2004 Francesco Lacarrubba and coworkers first described videodermoscopic features of alopecia areata (micro-exclamation hairs, yellow hyperkeratotic hair follicle openings, and black cadaverized hairs). In 2005 Malgorzata Olszewska and Lidia Rudnicka first used videodermoscopy for evaluation of disease severity in androgenic alopecia and for monitoring treatment efficacy. Characteristic images of female androgenic alopecia included hair shaft heterogeneity and increased percentage of thin (below 30 micrometers) hairs at the vertex. The Polish group then developed criteria to diagnose female androgenic alopecia based solely on videodermoscopy images. In 2006 Elizabeth K Ross and coworkers specified videodermoscopy features of different acquired hair and scalp diseases. In 2008 Adriana Rakowska and coworkers first showed usefulness of trichoscopy in diagnosing children with congenital hair shaft abnormalities. It was shown that this method is especially helpful in diagnosing monilethrix, Netherton syndrome and other pediatric diseases. In 2008 the first atlas containing trichoscopy images was published by Antonella Tosti.

The term "trichoscopy" was first introduced in 2006 by Lidia Rudnicka and Malgorzata Olszewska.

In 2011 Shigeki Inui published a trichoscopy algorithm, which allows differential diagnosis of most common hair and scalp diseases (including alopecia areata, androgenic alopecia, telogen effluvium and cicatricial alopecia) based on trichoscopy.

The "Atlas of Trichoscopy"(2013) is the first book to systematize scientific knowledge about trichoscopy.

In 2017 the International Trichoscopy Society was founded by four founding members: Lidia Rudnicka, Antonella Tosti, Rodrigo Pirmez and Daniel Asz Sigall. Lidia Rudnicka was elected first president of the International Trichoscopy Society. The first World Congress of the Society took place in 2018 in Warsaw, Poland.
