= Bonnet–Dechaume–Blanc syndrome =

- Other names: Arteriovenous aneurysm of mid-brain and retina, facial nevi and mental changes, Cerebrofacial arteriovenous metameric syndrome type 2
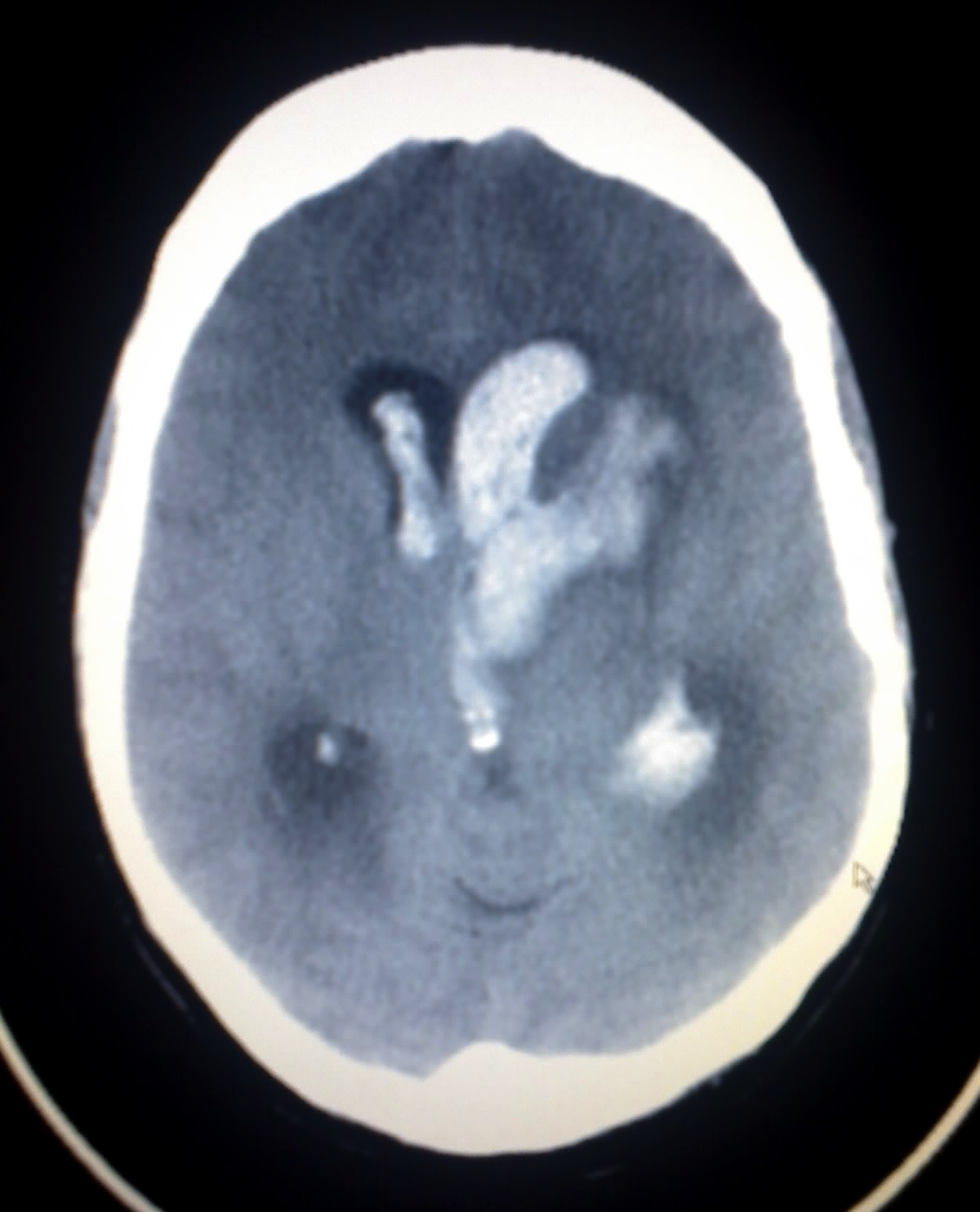
- CT scan showing intracranial hemorrhage
- Specialty: Medical genetics

Bonnet–Dechaume–Blanc syndrome, also known as Wyburn-Mason syndrome, is a rare congenital disorder characterized by arteriovenous malformations of the brain, retina or facial nevi. The syndrome has a number of possible symptoms and can, more rarely, affect the skin, bones, kidneys, muscles, and gastrointestinal tract. When the syndrome affects the brain, people can experience severe headaches, seizures, acute stroke, meningism, and progressive neurological deficits due to acute or chronic ischaemia caused by arteriovenous shunting.

In the retina, the syndrome causes retinocephalic vascular malformations that tend to be present with intracranial hemorrhage and lead to decreased visual acuity, proptosis, pupillary defects, optic atrophy, congestion of bulbar conjunctiva, and visual field defects. Retinal lesions can be unilateral and tortuous, and symptoms begin to appear in the second and third decades of life.

The syndrome can present with cutaneous lesions, or skin with different texture, thickness, and color, usually on the face. The facial features caused by the syndrome vary from slight discoloration to extensive nevi and angiomas of the skin. In some cases, the frontal and maxillary sinus may also be affected.

There have only been 52 reported cases of patients with Bonnet–Dechaume–Blanc syndrome as of 2012. Symptoms are rarely noticed in children and the syndrome is often diagnosed in late childhood or early adulthood when visual impairment is noticed. Fluorescein angiography is commonly used to diagnose the syndrome.

There have been several methods in treating patients with Bonnet–Dechaume–Blanc syndrome. However, the optimal treatment is uncertain. Patients with intracranial lesions have been treated with surgical intervention and in some cases, this procedure has been successful. Other treatments include embolization, radiation therapy, and continued observation.

With limited research on Bonnet–Dechaume–Blanc syndrome, researchers have focused on the clinical and radiological findings rather than how to manage this rare and non-heritable syndrome.

== Signs and symptoms ==
Left eye showing proptosis.

Typically not diagnosed until late childhood or later, Bonnet–Dechaume–Blanc syndrome usually presents itself with a combination of central nervous system features (midbrain), ophthalmic features (retina), and facial features. The degree of expression of the syndrome's components varies both clinically and structurally. Common symptoms that lead to diagnosis are headaches, retro-orbital pain, and hemianopia.

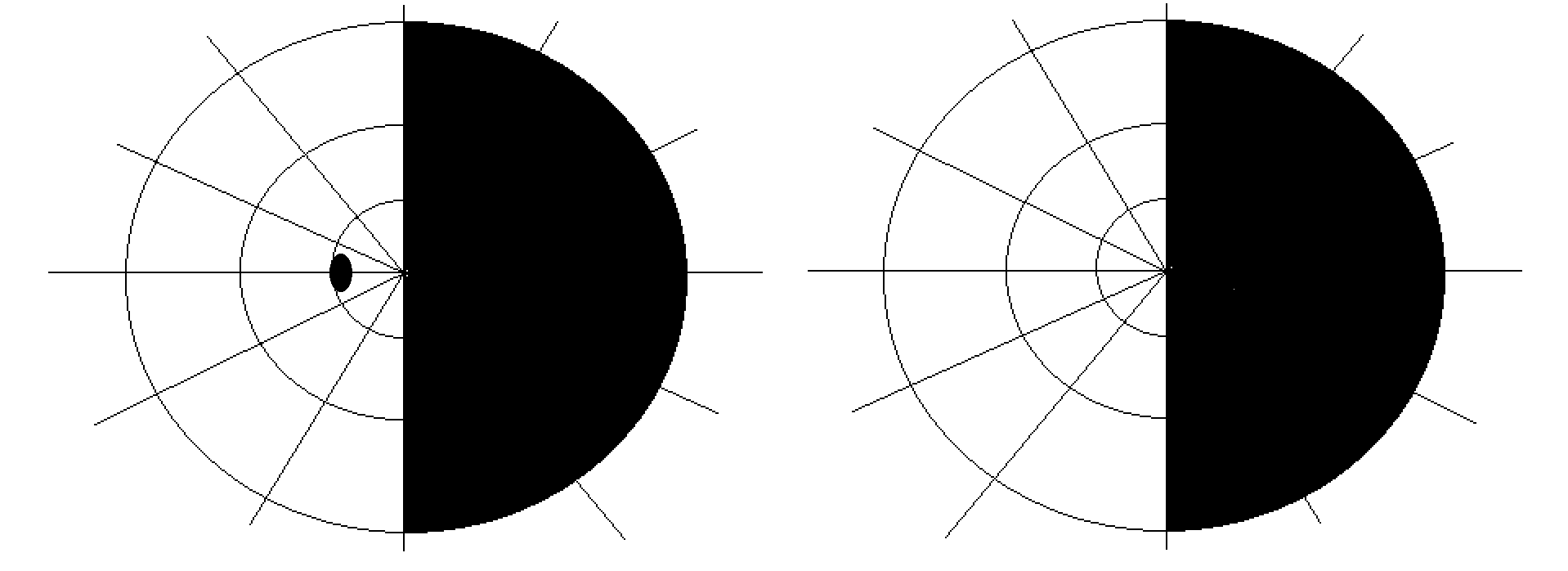
Visual field of homonymous hemianopia

The ophthalmic features of Bonnet–Dechaume–Blanc syndrome occur as retinal arteriovenous malformation (AVMs). There are three categories of AVMs based on their severity. The first category consists of the patient having small lesions that usually are asymptomatic. The second category, more severe than the first, is when the patient's malformation is missing a connecting capillary between an artery and a vein; without it, edema, hemorrhage, and visual impairment can result. Category three refers to malformations so severe that their dilated vessels no longer distinguish between artery and vein, and the patient has a significantly increased risk of vision loss. Since the retinal lesions categorized vary from large vascular malformations that affect a majority of the retina to malformations that are barely visible, the lesions can cause a wide range of symptoms, including decrease in visual sharpness, proptosis, pupillary defects, optic nerve degeneration, and visual field defects. The most common type of visual field impairment due to AVMs is homonymous hemianopia, which is usually unilateral.

Central nervous system (CNS) symptoms of Bonnet–Dechaume–Blanc syndrome are highly dependent on the locations and sizes of cerebral AVMs. The most common CNS feature is an intracranial hemangioma in the midbrain. Cerebral malformations can result in severe headaches, cerebral hemorrhages, vomiting, meningism, seizures, acute strokes, and progressive neurological deficits due to acute or chronic ischaemia caused by arteriovenous shunting.

The facial features of Bonnet–Dechaume–Blanc syndrome vary from case to case. A person showing signs of the syndrome may display faint skin discoloration, nevi, or angiomas of the skin. Some patients with this disorder also present with high-flow AVMs in the maxillofacial or mandibular (jaw) regions. Another facial indicator of this disease is malformations affecting the frontal or maxillary sinuses.

== Causes ==
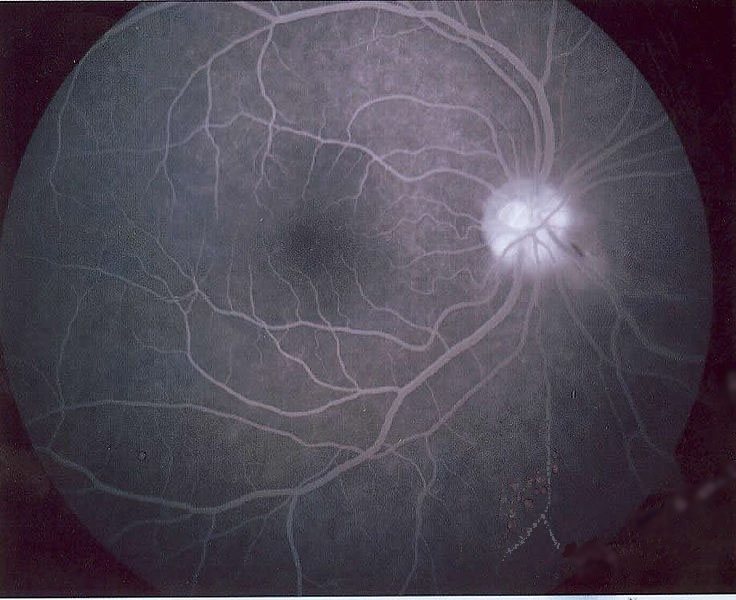
Fluorescein angiography can reveal arteriovenous malformations.

Bonnet–Dechaume–Blanc syndrome results from arteriovenous malformations. The exact cause of this disorder is unknown, and no specific genetic abnormality has been identified. The syndrome is a congenital disorder that begins to develop around the seventh week of gestation when the maturation of retinal mesenchymal cells do not grow properly. The abnormal development of vascular tissue leads to arteriovenous malformations, which affect both visual and cerebral structures.

== Diagnosis ==
Diagnosis commonly occurs later in childhood and often occurs incidentally in asymptomatic patients or as a cause of visual impairment.

A number of examinations can be used to determine the extent of the syndrome and its severity. Fluorescein angiography is quite useful in diagnosing retinal features of the disease, and the use of ultrasonography and optical coherence tomography (OCT) are helpful in confirming the disease. Neuro-ophthalmic examinations reveal pupillary defects (e.g. Marcus Gunn Pupil). Funduscopic examinations, examinations of the fundus of the eye, allow detection of arteriovenous malformations. Neurological examination can determine neurological deficits such as hemiparesis and paresthesias. MRI scans are used in imaging the brain and can allow visualization of the optic nerve and any possible atrophy. MRI, CT, and cerebral angiography may all be used to investigate the extent and location of any vascular lesions affecting the brain.

== Treatment ==
The treatment for Bonnet–Dechaume–Blanc syndrome is controversial due to a lack of consensus on the different therapeutic procedures for treating arteriovenous malformations. The first successful treatment was performed by Morgan et al., who combined intracranial resection, ligation of the ophthalmic artery, and selective arterial ligature of the external carotid artery. Notably, the patient did not have retinal vascular malformations.

Lesions are watched closely for changes in size. Prognosis is best when lesions are less than 3 cm in length. Most complications occur when the lesions are greater than 6 cm in size. Surgical intervention for intracranial lesions has been done successfully. Nonsurgical treatments include embolization, radiation therapy, and continued observation.

When pursuing treatment, it is important to consider the size of the malformations, their locations, and neurological involvement.
