= Woolly hair autosomal recessive =

Autosomal recessive woolly hair
- Autosomal recessive pattern is the inheritance manner of this condition
- Causes: Mutations in the LIPH, LPAR6 or KRT2 genes

Woolly hair autosomal recessive is a rare hereditary hair disorder characterized by sparse, short, curly hair.

== Signs/symptoms ==
The scalp hair is sparse, short and curly. It grows slowly and stops growing after a few inches.

== Genetics ==
This condition may be part of a more complex syndrome or an isolated mutation.

Isolated cases are due to mutations in the lipase member H (LIPH), lysophosphatidic acid receptor 6 (LPAR6) or keratin 2A (KRT2) genes. Isolated cases are inherited in an autosomal recessive fashion.

== Epidemiology ==
This is rare disorder. Precise estimates of its prevalence are not known.

== Diagnosis ==
This is made by light microscopy. A number of structural anomalies are visible under light microscopy including trichorrhexis nodosa and tapered ends.

=== Differential diagnosis ===
- Cardiofaciocutaneous syndrome
- Naxos disease
- Palmoplantar keratoderma and cardiomyopathy syndrome

== Treatment ==
There is no treatment for this condition known at present.

== Prognosis ==
In isolate cases life expectancy is normal and there are no other related problems.

As part of another syndrome this will depend on the other features of the syndrome.
