= Fredric Brandt =

American physician (1949–2015)

- Born: Fredric Sheldon Brandt; June 26, 1949; Newark, New Jersey, U.S.
- Died: April 5, 2015 (aged 65); Coconut Grove, Florida, U.S.
- Occupations: Physician, author
- Known for: Cosmetic dermatology and innovative skin care
- Website: www.drbrandtskincare.com www.drfredricbrandt.com drbrandtfoundation.org

Fredric Sheldon Brandt (June 26, 1949 – April 5, 2015) was an American physician, researcher, lecturer, author, and radio host specializing in cosmetic dermatology. Among the first to use botulinum toxin ("botox") and fillers, Brandt was noted for his role in the FDA approval of numerous fillers and botulinum toxins for cosmetic use in the United States.

Brandt, who hosted a radio show called Ask Dr. Brandt on SiriusXM radio and whose celebrity patients included Madonna, was called the "Baron of Botox" by W magazine and "King of Collagen" for using more botox and collagen than any other dermatologist in the world.

== Early life and career ==
Brandt was born into a Jewish family in Newark, New Jersey, where his parents, Irving and Esther Brandt, owned a candy shop. He graduated from Rutgers University in 1971. Brandt then obtained his medical degree from Hahnemann Medical College and completed an internal medicine residency at New York University, followed by a dermatology residency at the University of Miami. He set up a practice in Miami in 1982, and subsequently opened up a practice in New York City in 1998.

== Research Institute ==
Brandt's Dermatology Research Institute was located in his dermatology office in Miami, Florida. Along with his associates, Brandt performed clinical research on FDA-approved protocols for new fillers, forms of botulinum toxins, lasers, and cosmetic ingredients.

== Books ==
Brandt was the author of two books about the skin aging process and retention of youthful appearance.

- 10 Minutes/10 Years: Your Definitive Guide to a Beautiful and Youthful Appearance. New York: Free Press. (2007) ISBN 978-0743297080
- Age-less: The Definitive Guide to Botox, Collagen, Lasers, Peels, and Other Solutions for Flawless Skin. With Patricia Reynoso. New York: William Morrow. (2002); ISBN 978-0060516253

== Death ==
Brandt died from suicide on April 5, 2015, in his home in Coconut Grove, Florida, aged 65.
