= Alfred Milne Gossage =

British doctor and dean of Westminster Hospital (1864–1948)

Alfred Milne Gossage (1864 - 8 June 1948), was a British physician and dean of Westminster Hospital. He was an author in Garrod, Batten and Thursfield's Diseases of Children and Latham and English's System of Treatment. In 1908, he coined the term woolly hair after observing it in 18 members in three generations of a European family. He received the CBE in 1920.
