= Leon Goldman =

Leon Goldman (1906 – December 2, 1997) was an American dermatologist and a pioneer in laser medicine. His research areas included the application of lasers in dermatology, cancer photodynamic therapy (PDT) and the use of organic dyes in PDT.

In his honor, The American Society for Laser Medicine and Surgery (ASLMS) gives the yearly recognition named Leon Goldman Memorial Award. The Academy of Laser Dentistry also gives an award in recognition of Dr. Goldman. It is called, "The Leon Goldman Award" for Clinical Excellence.
