= Naxos syndrome =

Medical condition

Naxos disease
- Other names: Diffuse non-epidermolytic palmoplantar keratoderma with woolly hair and cardiomyopathy
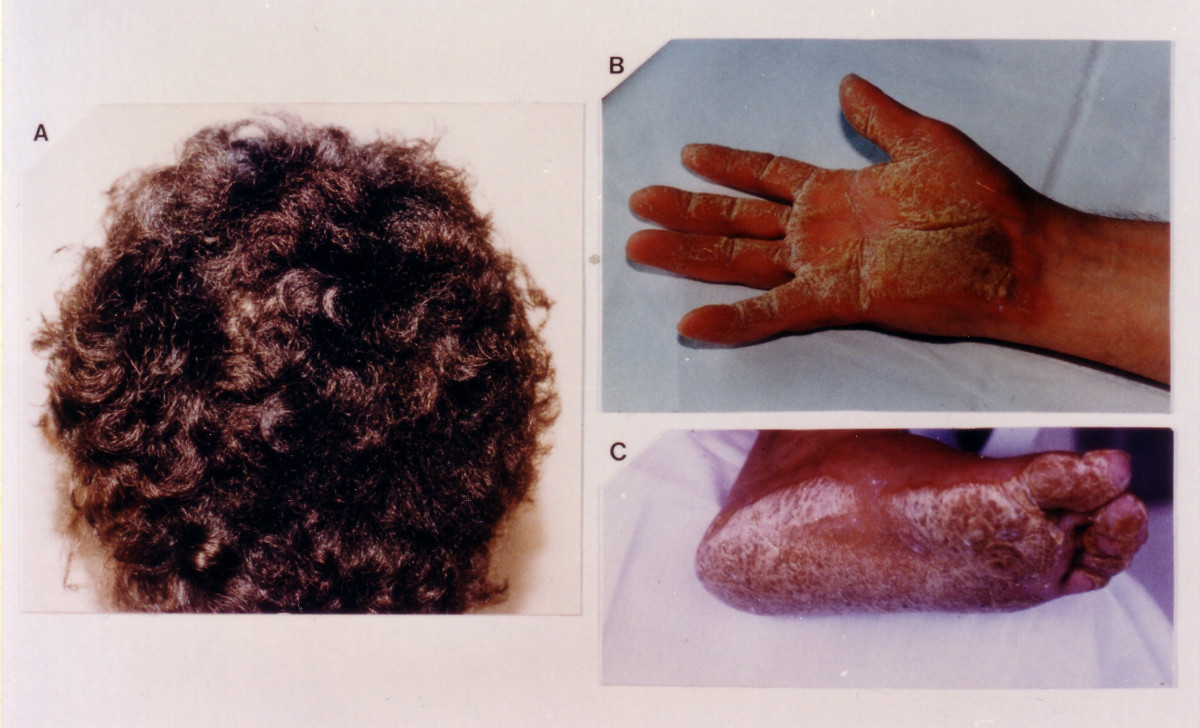
- Cutaneous phenotype of Naxos disease: woolly hair (A), palmar (B) and plantar (C) keratoses.

Naxos syndrome or Naxos disease (also known as "diffuse non-epidermolytic palmoplantar keratoderma with woolly hair and cardiomyopathy" or "diffuse palmoplantar keratoderma with woolly hair and arrhythmogenic right ventricular cardiomyopathy", first described on the island of Naxos by Dr. Nikos Protonotarios) is a cutaneous condition characterized by a palmoplantar keratoderma. The prevalence of the syndrome is up to 1 in every 1000 people in the Greek islands.

It has been associated with mutations in the genes encoding the proteins desmoplakin, plakoglobin, desmocollin-2, and SRC-interacting protein (SIP). Naxos disease has the same cutaneous phenotype as the Carvajal syndrome.

== Symptoms ==
Between 80 and 99% of those with Naxos disease will display some of the following symptoms:

- Disease of the heart muscle
- Thickening of palms and soles
- Sudden increased heart rate
- Dizzy spells
- Kinked hair

== See also ==
- Olmsted syndrome
- List of cutaneous conditions
- List of conditions caused by problems with junctional proteins
