= Follicular drug delivery =

Drug delivery into hair follicles

Follicular drug delivery is a mechanism that enables the transport of therapeutic agents through the hair follicles present on the skin. This approach leverages the use of nanoparticles, which are widely employed in the broader field of drug delivery, to specifically target and penetrate these follicular pathways. By utilizing follicular delivery, drugs can be delivered in a more targeted and localized manner to treat conditions including acne, alopecia, fungal infections, and skin cancer. This article will explore the anatomy of the hair follicle, various drug carriers and delivery vehicles utilized, relevant in vitro and in vivo models, current clinical applications, and the existing challenges and future directions within this field.

== Background ==
Targeted drug delivery is a therapeutic approach designed to concentrate medications at specific sites within the body, enhancing drug concentration at the intended site while minimizing exposure to non-target areas. This approach helps improve treatment outcomes and minimize side effects. Within the various targeted drug delivery approaches, follicular drug delivery specifically targets hair follicles, with the aim of delivering drugs to treat skin-associated infections and conditions.

Key considerations in experimental design for follicular drug delivery include hair follicle anatomy and circulatory proximity, specific target sites for drug delivery, models for follicular delivery, quantitative assessment methods, and formulation design. The target region within the hair follicle must be clearly defined for the formulation and delivery approach.

=== Hair Follicle Anatomy ===
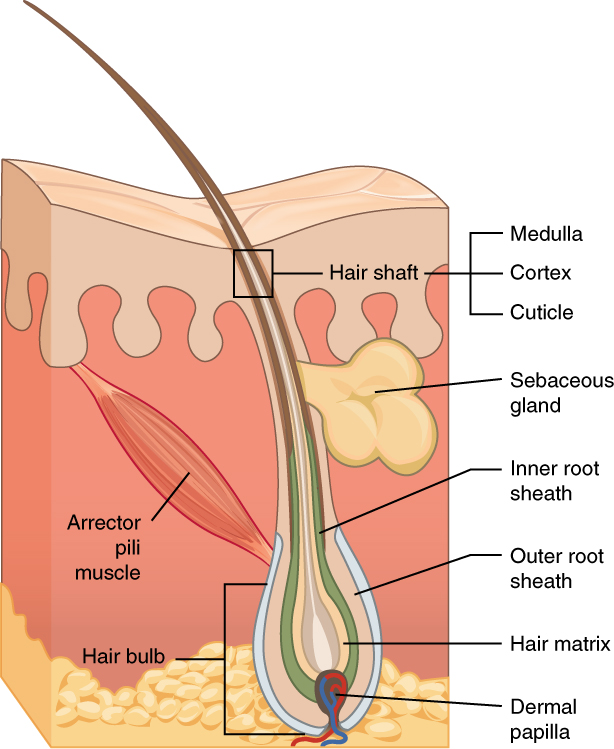
A section of the skin showing the dermis, epidermis, hair shaft and follicle, arrector pili muscles, and sebaceous glands.

Hair is separated into two distinct regions. One region is the hair shaft, which protrudes from the skin's surface. The hair shaft consists of three layers. The inner layer is the medulla. This layer is surrounded by the cortex. The cuticle is a single-cell layer that shields the cortex and medulla from the surrounding skin. The second region is the hair follicle, which rises from the surface of the epidermis and has a structural unit called the pilosebaceous unit. The pilosebaceous unit is made up of the hair follicle, its associated sebaceous gland, and the arrector pili muscle. The hair follicle consists of the inner root sheath and outer root sheath. The inner root sheath protects the growing hair, while the outer root sheath is continuous with the epidermal layer, increasing the surface area for absorption beneath the skin's surface. The arrector pili muscle is a small band of smooth muscle fibers that attaches to the follicle. The sebaceous gland secretes a lipid-rich sebum onto hair follicles which protects the hair and provides a hydrophobic protective barrier over the skin. This lipid-rich environment may provide a lipophilic pathway for potential drug delivery.

== Drug Carriers ==
Nanoparticles, including nanocrystals, micelles, lipid, polymeric, and silica nanoparticles, and exosomes are all drug carriers used in follicular drug delivery. When each of these drug carriers are applied to the surface of the skin, they can travel down the hair shaft, bypassing the outer layer of the skin. This section will outline the structure and function of each nanoparticle, and how it lends itself specifically towards follicular drug delivery.

=== Nanocrystals ===
Nanocrystals are nanosized, inorganic materials that are within thermodynamically stable colloidal solutions. They have a crystalline structure and are between 1 and 1000 μm in diameter. Unlike other nanoparticles, there is no carrier material, meaning that nanocrystals only consist of the drug being delivered. When the drug is dispersed into liquid media, it undergoes surface degradation, with the dispersed particles needing to be stabilized. Nanocrystals are much more drug-saturated, and their dissolution process is significantly faster than that of when the drug is in its normal state, increasing the bioavailability of the drug during delivery.

Nanocrystals interface well with follicular drug delivery because of their small size, their reliance on surface degradation during drug delivery, the establishment of a concentration gradient along the length of the hair follicle, and the high drug saturation within the nanocrystal. Once on the skin, the nanocrystals travel down the hair shaft of the follicle, bypassing the outer layer of the skin due to the concentration gradient, and then form localized depots within the hair follicle, allowing for sustained drug release and therapeutic effects. Once past the outer layer of the skin, the drug can more easily diffuse through the skin, as this layer is more permeable.

=== Polymeric Micelles ===
Micelles are spherical molecules formed when lipids are placed in a hydrophilic solvent. Lipids are small molecules consisting of a hydrophilic head and at least one hydrophobic tail. When enough lipids are placed into a hydrophilic substance, a concentration known as the Critical Micelle Concentration, they aggregate into spherical molecules, with their hydrophilic heads on the exterior and their hydrophobic tails on the interior.

A diagram outlining the structure of a micelle in an aqueous solution, namely its hydrophilic head on the exterior and hydrophobic tail on the interior of its spherical structure.

In drug delivery, polymeric micelles are preferred to classic micelles due to their lower critical micelle concentration and higher stability upon dilution. Polymeric micelles rely on the spontaneous formation of spherical molecules from amphiphilic block copolymers, rather than lipids, when placed in a hydrophilic substance. The exterior of these spherical molecules consists of a hydrophilic shell, with the core being hydrophobic. In drug delivery, the hydrophobic drug of interest is present in the hydrophilic substance when the lipids are added, ensuring that when the micelles form, the hydrophobic drug becomes trapped within the core of the micelle. These copolymers have a customizable size and makeup, allowing for more flexibility in loading capacity, rate of degradation, and therapeutic potential. Polymeric micelles are small enough to access tissues with leaky vasculature, can improve the solubility of poorly water-soluble drugs, and can remain in the blood for a longer period of time, allowing for accumulation of the drug at the desired location.

Polymeric micelles are considered effective in follicular drug delivery due to their small size, high stability, and ability to make water-insoluble drugs soluble. When polymeric micelles make contact with the skin, they can travel down the hair shaft, bypassing the outer layer of the skin, with smaller micelles permeating further into the hair follicle.

=== Lipid Nanoparticles ===
A diagram of the makeup of a lipid nanoparticle, including the drug payload (green) within the hydrophilic core and the lipid bilayer. Red denotes the hydrophilic heads and gray denotes the hydrophobic tails of individual lipids.

Lipid nanoparticles are spherical molecules with a diameter between 10 and 500 nm made up of a lipid bilayer with a hydrophilic core and exterior, and a hydrophobic intermediate layer. The hydrophilic core can contain a hydrophilic drug payload, protecting the drug from degradation in the body, increasing solubility and efficacy, and altering distribution of the drug to the desired sites. The hydrophobic intermediate layer can also contain a hydrophobic drug, increasing its solubility and bioavailability within the body.

Lipid nanoparticles enter the hair follicle via the hair shaft and travel down the length of the follicle, where they sit and deliver the drug over a sustained period of time. The lipid nanoparticles remain in the follicle until slow processes like hair growth, shedding and sebum flow remove the follicles from the pores.

=== Polymeric Nanoparticles ===
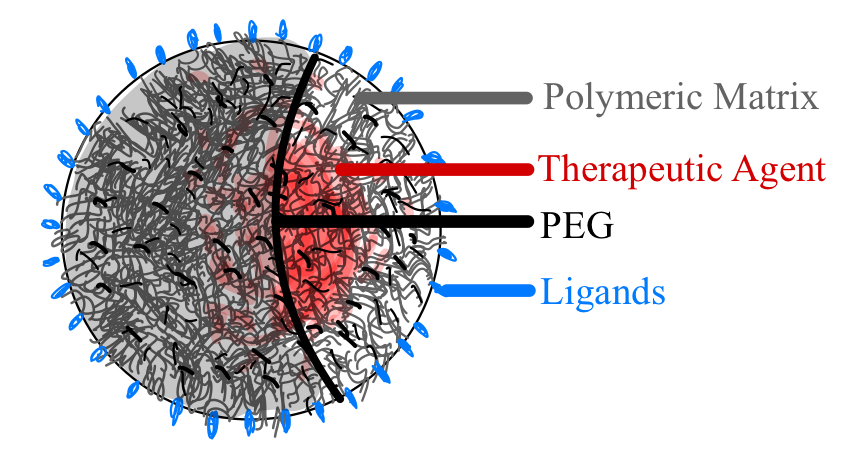
Diagram of a polymeric nanoparticle

Polymeric nanoparticles are nanoscale-sized delivery systems composed of drug, polymer, and surfactants. These carriers can be made from hydrophilic natural polymers, like proteins, or from hydrophobic synthetic polymers. Their versatility allows them to be administered through various dosage forms, including topical applications. Polymeric nanoparticles have high encapsulation efficiency and physical stability, which can be optimized based on the method of preparation and the physicochemical properties of the constituent materials. The polymeric coating protects the active drug from premature degradation, improves steric stability, and minimizes irritation upon application. Additionally, these nanoparticles can be mucoadhesive, biodegradable, and provide skin permeation enhancement, improving both therapeutic efficacy and safety.

In general, polymeric nanoparticles exhibit a natural tendency to accumulate within the hair follicle cavities. The targeting efficiency of these systems can be enhanced by modulating their surface properties, including particle size, superficial charge, and aggregation state. These particles can also be functionalized with an antibody or a substance that promotes the targeting of the particle and facilitates site-specific drug delivery.

=== Silica Nanoparticles ===
Silicon dioxide nanoparticles are inorganic nanoparticles made up of an alternating mixture of silicon and oxygen atoms, with dimensions between 400 and 700 nm. These nanoparticles are hydrophilic, biocompatible, and have low-cost synthesis and dispersive properties. Silica nanoparticles have a porous structure which produces cavities that can store and release a variety of substances and provide a high specific surface area, stable structure, and easy modification.

For follicular drug delivery, the particle surface chemistry influences the effectiveness of the silica nanoparticles. Thiolated silica nanoparticles have demonstrated strong binding affinity to hair shafts and the outer skin stratum corneum. Polyethylene glycol (PEG)-modified silica nanoparticles have demonstrated improved diffusivity and increased follicular penetration. Larger PEGylated particles were observed to penetrate the follicular structure more deeply compared to smaller sizes.

=== Exosome Therapy ===
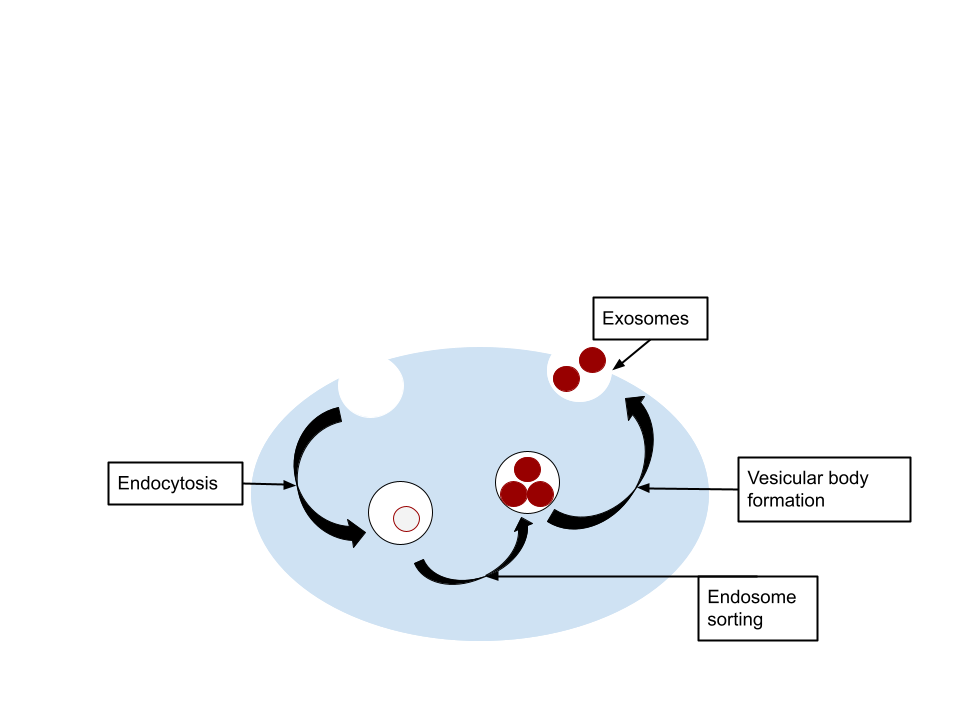
This figure shows how exosomes are formed.

Exosomes, a class of extracellular vehicles (EVs), are nanoscale vesicles with diameters ranging from 30 to 150 nm. These vesicles are secreted by a wide variety of cell types and are characterized by a phospholipid bilayer structure. As mediators of intercellular communication, exosomes play a role in processes including homeostasis, cellular differentiation, and organogenesis. Exosomes encapsulate molecules within the vesicle, providing protection against degradation and allowing for potential targeted delivery to recipient cells. Their ability to transfer bioactive molecules has made them a subject of increasing interest in therapeutic research.

Exosomes have been observed to affect hair follicle cell function, including proliferation, differentiation, and survival. Notably, exosomes are capable of carrying hydrophobic Wnt proteins on their surface over a long distance. These proteins induce the activation of β-catenin, a key signaling pathway in the regulation of hair regeneration and morphogenesis. Exosomes that are derived from mesenchymal stem cells (MSCs) have been used in experimental studies related to hair growth and regeneration. These MSC-derived exosomes offer properties such as lower immunogenicity and greater scalability.

== Delivery Vehicles ==
Conventional follicular drug delivery relies on the use of topical delivery vehicles, such as gels and microneedles, to deliver nanoparticles containing the necessary drugs to hair follicles.

=== Gels ===
Gels are semi-solid materials that range from being soft and weak to hard and tough. Gels consist of a cross-linked, primarily polymer network suspended in a liquid medium, and the properties of a gel depend heavily on the interactions between these two components. The bilayer composition and structure allows for a more effective and less toxic administration of drugs compared to previous methods. External topical gels are typically used for follicular drug delivery. These gels are spread or sprayed over the affected area of the skin. Rather than penetrating the skin, topical gels sit on the skin for a longer period of time, allowing for drug absorption. The drug carriers are embedded into the gel matrix, from where they can disperse into the hair follicles. This vehicle interfaces well with the drug carriers previously mentioned, as it allows for the carriers to remain on the skin, eventually traveling into the hair follicles, driven by a concentration gradient.

=== Microneedles ===
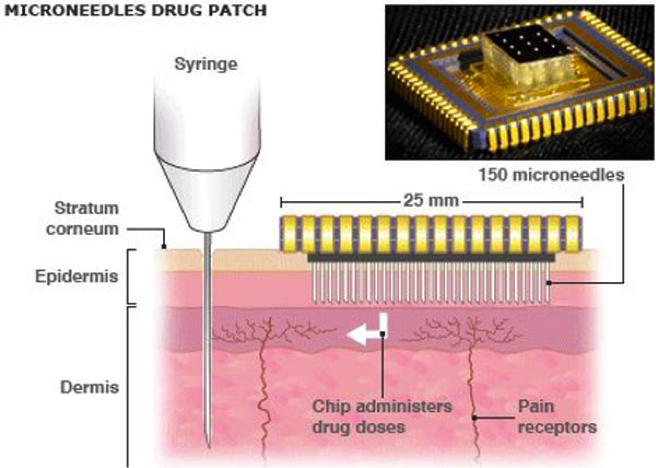
This image shows how microneedles bypass the outer layer of the skin without hitting the pain receptors.

Microneedles are three-dimensional mechanical, needle-like structures that make small penetrations into the outer layer of the skin barrier, allowing for drug delivery beyond the outer skin layer and into the pilosebaceous unit. There are five types of microneedles: solid, coated, hollow, dissolvable, and hydrogel-forming, with each type having its own utility. Solid microneedles puncture the skin and are removed, at which point a patch of drug is placed on the area in question; coated microneedles have the drug coated on the needles themselves, so when the skin is punctured, the drug is delivered into the area, with removal of the microneedle ending delivery. Hollow microneedles have a channel through which drug can flow; dissolvable microneedles degrade as the drug is released, with the base of the needle removed at the completion of administration. Hydrogel-forming microneedles absorb fluid within the tissue and swell, then the drugs within the hydrogel structure are released along a concentration gradient into the dermal layer. This vehicle interfaces well with the drug carriers discussed in the previous section because it provides a more direct route for the carriers to travel into the hair follicles.

== In Vitro and In Vivo Models ==
Follicular drug delivery research utilizes multiple in vitro and in vivo models, each offering unique advantages for studying efficacy and safety.

=== In Vitro Models ===
Various in vitro models are employed to investigate follicular drug delivery, including excised skin models, reconstructed human skin models, and isolated hair follicle studies.

Excised skin models typically rely on human cadaver skin or skin obtained from surgical procedures as the gold standard, but porcine skin, specifically from the ear, is also widely accepted due to its similarities in hair follicle density and structure to human skin. The preparation of excised skin for in vitro studies typically involves the removal of subcutaneous tissue, and storage conditions are carefully controlled to preserve skin integrity.

Reconstructed human skin models with functional hair follicles is an area of ongoing research aiming to create more physiologically accurate in vitro systems using epidermal equivalents and full-thickness skin models. These models rely on the application of 3D printing to model the human skin. While reconstructed human skin models do have better standardization and reduced inter-individual variability compared to excised skin models, they still face limitations including potential impairment of barrier properties and a lack of complete skin appendages.

Isolated hair follicle studies isolate and culture individual hair follicles to study drug penetration and metabolism within the follicle in a more controlled manner. This approach is more focused on investigating intrafollicular drug behavior, eliminating the influence of the surrounding skin to evaluate the effects of active compounds on hair growth and follicle biology.

In vitro testing methodologies for follicular delivery include Franz diffusion cell assays, tape stripping techniques, confocal and fluorescence microscopy, and flow-through cell systems. Franz diffusion cell assays provide a quantitative measure of drug permeation and retention in excised skin, allowing for the comparison of different formulations and penetration enhancers. Tape stripping techniques sequentially remove the stratum corneum layers using adhesive tapes to assess the depth and distribution of topically applied substances. Confocal microscopy uses lasers to obtain high-resolution, non-invasive imaging of drug distribution in different skin layers and within follicular structures, and Fluorescence microscopy tags drugs with a fluorescent marker to visualize their penetration pathways and distribution within hair follicles and surrounding skin tissue. Flow-through cell systems use a continuous flow of receptor fluid, to create a more dynamic assessment of drug release and permeation through follicular pathways over extended periods.

=== In Vivo Models ===
In vivo models provide insights into follicular drug delivery in a natural physiological environment and undergo normal cyclic activity. Rodent models are widely used due to their ease of handling, short hair cycles, and availability of genetically modified strains. Although these models are suitable for studying normal hair cycling, their anatomical differences limit the direct translatability of findings to humans. Large animal models offer closer approximation to human skin in terms of follicular structure and depth. They also allow for real-time monitoring of intrafollicular processes. Xenograft models are used for investigating androgen action and other mechanisms related to follicular delivery. In these models, human skin grafts are transplanted onto immunodeficient mice. These grafts retain the structural characteristics of human follicles and have contributed to the understanding of alopecia areata and androgenetic alopecia.

== Clinical Applications ==
Heightened interest in hair follicles stem from several dermatological abnormalities that relate to the follicles, including acne, androgenetic alopecia, and some skin cancers.

=== Acne ===
Acne, or acne vulgaris, is a chronic skin condition in which oil and dead skin cells clog the hair follicles, leading to pimples, blackheads, and whiteheads. Because acne occurs within the hair follicles, follicular drug delivery is a popular area of research in combating this condition for its potential for localized delivery, sustained release, and enhanced penetration. Acne can be treated either systemically or topically, and while current systemic treatments are more effective, they lead to side effects including gastrointestinal irritation, liver toxicity, and fetal abnormalities that are otherwise avoided with topical treatment. Topical delivery of nanoparticles through hair follicles offers an alternative approach, avoiding the side effects of systemic delivery thanks to the localization of the drug to the hair follicles.

=== Alopecia ===
Alopecia, hair loss on the scalp or other parts of the body, can occur in various forms with a range of severity and differing causes. Each type of alopecia affects the hair follicle, disrupting its growth and function. Traditional treatment options for alopecia, such as topical and oral medications, have limitations including systemic side effects and poor penetration. Follicular drug delivery is being explored to overcome these challenges by enabling localized, sustained, and biologically relevant drug release.

Androgenic alopecia is a type of alopecia characterized by pattern hair loss. This condition is driven by elevated androgen levels, which contribute to the gradual miniaturization of hair follicles during the growth phase, resulting in hair thinning and balding. Due to the adverse systemic effects of widespread hormonal modulation that occur from oral antiandrogens to treat this condition, localized drug delivery to the pilosebaceous unit is being explored. Research is investigating incorporation of antiandrogenic drugs within nanostructured lipid carriers. These lipid-based nanoparticles can localize within the hair follicle reservoir, enabling controlled drug release and reducing systemic absorption.

=== Fungal Infections ===
Superficial mycoses, or fungal infections of the skin or hair shaft, often localize in the stratum corneum, hair shafts, and follicular openings. Follicular drug delivery can target dermatophytosis fungal infections that penetrate in or through hair follicles. Topical therapy provides site-specific delivery, reduces systemic toxicity, increases drug retention rate, and enhances bioavailability and efficacy. Common antifungals have been encapsulated in polymeric micelles, which enhance skin penetration and protect the drug from degradation

=== Skin Cancers ===
Skin cancer is a type of cancer that arises from the skin, and is caused by abnormal development and proliferation of cells. Traditional treatment options for skin cancers include surgical excision, radiation therapy, topical agents, and systemic chemotherapy. While these approaches can be effective, they face limitations due to systemic toxicity, off-target effects, and challenges in treating deeper or metastatic tumors.

Follicular drug delivery offers several potential advantages for skin cancer treatment. It allows for localized delivery of anticancer drugs directly to the tumor site, potentially increasing therapeutic efficacy while reducing systemic side effects associated with conventional chemotherapy. The hair follicle can also act as a reservoir, enabling sustained drug release and prolonged therapeutic effects, which can be particularly beneficial for maintaining cytotoxic concentrations at the tumor site over extended periods. Compared to traditional topical formulations that often struggle to penetrate beyond the superficial layers of the skin, follicular delivery can achieve enhanced penetration depth, crucial for reaching tumor cells located in deeper skin layers or within the follicle itself. Furthermore, by delivering drugs topically, follicular drug delivery can avoid the first-pass metabolism that occurs with oral drug administration, potentially increasing the bioavailability of certain anticancer agents at the target site.

== Challenges ==
There are several challenges that follicular drug delivery has yet to overcome in its path to clinical usage, some of which are due to the incomplete understanding of how drugs can overcome the barriers to enter and transport through the pilosebaceous unit. Oftentimes, sebum or dead skin blocks the hair shaft, preventing drugs from entering the follicle. Once inside the hair follicle, drugs still must face the presence of sebum, which acts as a barrier to delivery of both hydrophilic and hydrophobic drugs. Hydrophilic drugs are blocked from transport through the follicle, while hydrophobic drugs become encapsulated by sebum, unable to reach target cells. Additionally, the changes in the properties of hair follicles during the anagen, catagen, and telogen growth phases lead to disparate levels of drug penetration. Because of these barriers, creation of a vehicular formulation that can spread readily on the skin's surface and preferentially enter the follicular openings has proven difficult.

More generally, the field of follicular drug delivery as a whole has struggled to translate preclinical animal model data into human clinical data due to anatomical differences present in the animal model. Lastly, concerns surrounding the potential toxicity of long-term use of nanoparticles still need to be investigated as follicular drug delivery relies on sustained release to increase therapeutic effect.

== Future development ==
Emerging research into improving follicular drug delivery involves creating systems that can provide controlled release in response to specific stimuli present within the follicular environment, such as changes in pH, temperature, or the presence of specific enzymes. Nanocarriers are also being designed with tailored properties, including modifying their surface charge and particle size to improve penetration into the hair follicle, and increase the precision of targeting specific areas within the hair follicle. One study found that stem cell membrane-coated nanoparticles had improved biocompatibility, enhanced targeting of specific cell types within the hair follicle, and sustained release of the encapsulated drug. Overall, follicular drug delivery is working towards more sophisticated and bio-inspired drug delivery systems that can overcome existing limitations and achieve more precise and effective drug delivery to hair follicles and their surrounding structures.
