= Root sheath (hair) =

Coat around the root of a hair follicle

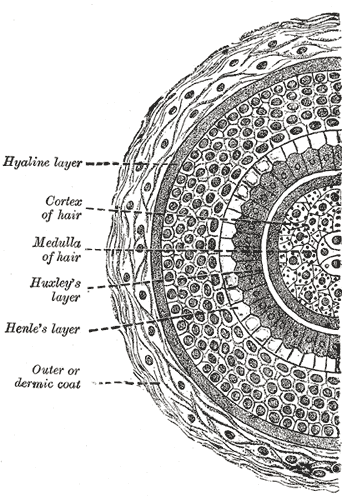
- Transverse section of hair follicle.

The inner or epidermic coat of the hair follicle is closely adherent to the root of the hair, and consists of two layers: the outer and inner root sheaths.

== Outer root sheath ==
The outer root sheath corresponds with the stratum mucosum (stratum germinativum and stratum spinosum) of the epidermis, and resembles it in the rounded form and soft character of its cells; at the bottom of the hair follicle these cells become continuous with those of the root of the hair.

The term trichilemmal refers to the outer root sheath.

== Inner root sheath ==
The inner root sheath (IRS) functions to mould, adhere, as well as participate in the keratinization of growing hair.

The inner root sheath consists of:

1. a delicate cuticle next to the hair, composed of a single layer of imbricated scales with atrophied nuclei
2. Huxley's layer
3. Henle's layer

== See also ==
- Cortex (hair)
- Medulla (hair)
- Hair follicle
