= Loose anagen syndrome =

- Other names: Loose anagen hair syndrome
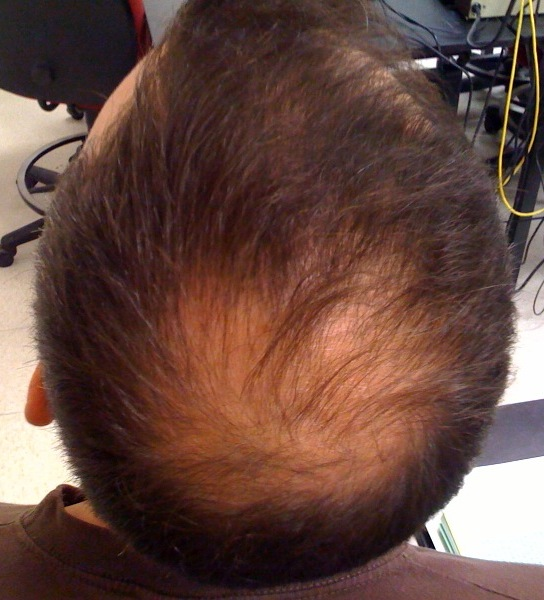
- Hair loss and thinning at the back of the scalp
- Pronunciation: / lʉːs ænədʒən ‘sɪndrəʊm /
- Specialty: Dermatology
- Differential diagnosis: Short anagen syndrome, alopecia areata, telogen effluvium, trichotillomania, toxic ingestion
- Treatment: Minoxidil
- Frequency: 2-2.5 cases per million people, 6:1 ratio; females to males respectively

Loose anagen syndrome, also known as loose anagen hair syndrome, is a hair disorder related to dermatology. It is characterised by the easy and pain free detachment of anagen staged hairs from the scalp. This hair condition can be spontaneous or genetically inherited.

Loose anagen syndrome is primarily described in fair-haired children who have easily dislodgeable hair. It is commonly present in younger children, generally between the ages of 2 and 8. It is especially observed in female children with light coloured hair. Females and males have differences in hair. There are knowledge gaps about loose anagen syndrome in males, and a 6 to 1 incidence ratio of females to males with loose anagen syndrome, respectively. Loose anagen syndrome may also be misdiagnosed in males, as males traditionally have short hair.

Patients with loose anagen hair syndrome usually experience hair thinning around the whole scalp or at the occipital scalp, at the back of the head. Although this is a hair condition, there have only been reports of this condition also affecting the patient's eyebrows. There are no noted impacts on any other hairs of the body such as eyebrows and eyelashes. It also does not have any impacts on nails, teeth or skin.

Loose anagen syndrome is more predominantly seen in fairer skin and it is not as common in dark skin populations. Abdel-Raouf, El-Din, Awad, Ashraf, Mohammad, Hosan, Hasan, Moetaz, Tag and Mohammad have reported a population of dark skinned individuals with loose anagen syndrome. Each year there are approximately 2 to 2.5 cases per million people with loose anagen hair syndrome.

== Causes ==
The main pathological cause of loose anagen syndrome is the absence or insufficient amount of the inner root sheath in the anagen staged hairs. This creates a gap in the linking between the inner root sheath and the hair cuticles. Both of these hair features stimulate hair growth but with this detachment in the linking, loose anagen hairs are not able to grow to a long length. The abnormalities caused by the inner root sheath creates disruption in the support and anchoring of the anagen hairs. Patients with loose anagen hair syndrome have mutations in the protein keratin K6HF, which is located in the middle of the hair shaft and inner root sheath, the companion layer. These mutations account for the phenotypical features of loose anagen syndrome.

In the Huxley cells of the inner root sheath of abnormal anagen hairs, there is the formation of vacuoles and the build-up of fluid which is not usually seen. There are also dyskeratotic modifications in the Henle cells, as well as the cuticle cells in both the inner root sheath and hair shaft. The hair shaft has been reported as thin for some cases and normally structured for other loose anagen syndrome reports. The inner root sheath of normal anagen hairs usually do not have keratin in the Huxley cells, Henle cells and inner root sheath. They are usually organised in an orderly manner and densely compacted.

Genetics is one of the causing factors of loose anagen syndrome. It has been studied that this hair condition is autosomal dominantly inherited.

== Diagnosis ==
Patients with loose anagen syndrome do not report the same hair abnormalities. Loose anagen syndrome is usually diagnosed after taking into consideration the physical examination, clinical history and a microscopic examination of the hairs of the patient. Some patients visit a dermatologist for diagnosis and to distinguish between loose anagen hair syndrome and other conditions that it can be misdiagnosed for.

A pull test is performed in order to diagnose a patient with loose anagen hair syndrome as one of the characteristics of this hair condition is hair that is easily removed from the scalp. A group of around 40-60 hairs, that are attached to the scalp, is pulled in a clement manner. The patient will be diagnosed with loose anagen syndrome if great amounts of hair is detached from the head. If at least 50% of the hairs removed is at the anagen hair stage, the outcome of the pull test is positive. The detachment of only 4-6 hairs is considered a normal outcome, as approximately 10% of the hairs on the scalp are at the telogen stage. The removed loose anagen hairs are not fragile and are of normal tensile strength.

In an electron microscope image of a loose anagen hair, deformities such as grooves, curls and ridges are visible in the hair shaft, which is made from keratin. A cross-sectional examination of a loose anagen hair displays irregularity such as the shape of the hair being triangular rather than oval. The electron microscopy scanned image of the inner root sheath of a loose anagen hair would exhibit ultrastructural changes. These changes are visible in the Huxley layer, Henle layer and the cuticle of the loose anagen hair. An electron microscopy image of outer root sheath of a loose anagen hair would display malformations and weak linkage in the cells within the epithelium of the outer root sheath. This irregularity within the outer root sheath of a loose anagen hair is considered the most notable change when examining a loose anagen hair under an electron microscope.

In a histopathological examination, the different layers of the loose anagen hair follicle will display a deficiency of clarity between the layers. This incoherence is also visible in a histological slide of the inner root sheath and of the outer root sheath.

Biopsies are not necessary for the diagnosis of loose anagen hair syndrome. A biopsy will display non-inflammatory, non-scarring alopecia.

The texture of the hair varies with some reports stating that patients with loose anagen syndrome have hairs that are rough, brittle and sticky. This may be the result of the deformations of the hair shaft. These changes in texture limits the ability for adjacent loose anagen hairs to rest flat on the scalp. The patient can have thinning and loss of hair around the whole scalp, at the occipital scalp or around the scalp in odd, irregular patches. Loose anagen syndrome hairs at the occipital scalp can be knotted easily when there's movement of those hairs against the pillow at night.

There are 3 different types of loose anagen hair syndrome. Loose anagen syndrome type A is when the hair of the patient appears to be fine and thinly distributed. Patients with type A loose anagen syndrome experience a decrease in the density of their hairs. Patients diagnosed with type B loose anagen hair syndrome tend to have hair that is difficult to manage and has a disordered, unruly appearance. Type C loose anagen syndrome is when the hair sheds but the appearance of their hair appears to be normal. Loose anagen syndrome type A and B are more prevalent in children. Loose anagen hair syndrome type C is most frequently seen in adults. There is not specific treatment for each type of loose anagen syndrome. It is also unknown as to how each type is developed.

=== Differential diagnosis ===
Loose Anagen Syndrome can commonly be misdiagnosed for other skin and hair disorders such as short anagen syndrome, alopecia areata, telogen effluvium, trichotillomania and toxic ingestion. Similar symptoms and signs appear in these conditions, however there are different aspects that distinguish each one from another.

Short anagen syndrome and loose anagen syndrome are similar as both conditions lead to the inability to grow long hair and patients rarely need to get their hair cut. A difference between these two hair disorders is that in loose anagen syndrome there are dystrophic hairs which are absent in patients with short anagen syndrome.

Patients with loose anagen syndrome may experience the thinning of their hair which is also a factor of alopecia areata. In order to distinguish between these two conditions, if dots, hairs with tapered roots or vellus hairs are visible in a microscopic examination of the skin this will lead to the diagnosis of alopecia areta rather than loose anagen syndrome.

Hair loss can lead to other symptoms and signs such as weight loss, behavioural changes, short temper, abdominal pain and problems with learning. These signs are also observed in children with toxic ingestion which is one of the differential diagnosis.

A pull test is also used in the diagnosis of telogen effluvium. The hairs that are removed in a telogen effluvium pull test are telogen staged hairs instead of being at the anagen stage as seen in loose anagen hair syndrome.

=== Associated conditions ===
Loose anagen syndrome usually appears as an individual condition. Loose anagen syndrome can be present with other conditions related to genetics or developmental conditions.
Examples of these conditions include; Coloboma, Noonan syndrome, Hypohidrotic ectodermal dysplasia, EEC (ectrodactyly- ectodermal dysplasia-clefting) syndrome, Neurofibromatosis, Trichorhinophalangeal syndrome, Trichotillomania, Nail-patella syndrome and Woolly hair.

Loose anagen hair syndrome has also been associated with AIDS.

Alopecia areata patients can also develop loose anagen syndrome.

== Treatment ==
Minoxidil chemical structure

Loose anagen syndrome usually does not need treatment as this hair condition tends to improve with age and is self-limited. Many patients affected by loose anagen hair syndrome encounter spontaneous recovery by adulthood. The thickness and length of the hair of loose anagen syndrome patients have a tendency to improve and becomes more enhanced, especially post puberty. For some patients, improvement is observed from the ages of 8 or 9. There is still a defect in the connection of the hair shaft and inner root sheath, however it is not as severe and the hairs are not as easily detached as it was for these patients when they were young children. Patients can seek assistance and treatment can be pursued.

The aims of treatment is to reduce the trauma being enacted on loose anagen hairs and to reassure loose anagen hair syndrome patients that over time there will be improvement in the cosmetics of their hair. Paediatricians, paediatric nurse practitioners and physician assistances are usually the first people to detect this hair condition in children. There are no surgical, physical or systemic medical treatment options for loose anagen syndrome.

Patients with more severe cases of loose anagen hair syndrome can be treated with minoxidil, a topical medical treatment, as a first line treatment. Minoxidil can extend the duration of the hair in the anagen stage and restore the hair follicles for further growth or for the full period of the anagen phase. The hair of an individual without loose anagen hair syndrome is in the anagen hair phase for approximately 3 to 5 years. Minoxidil can be used as it enriches the cells of the hair by heightening the blood supply of local cutaneous. From this, there is intensified DNA synthesis occurring in both follicular keratinocytes and non-follicular, as well as an increase in cell multiplication. The degree of hair shedding is reduced with the use of minoxidil. 7 in 11 loose anagen hair syndrome patients find visible improvement after using minoxidil lotion. Treatment involving the maintenance of nutrients within the patient and biotin have not made any noted impacts to the improvement of loose anagen hair syndrome.

=== Management ===
For children, changes to their lifestyle and daily routine are altered and improved to reduce trauma to hair. This includes modifications in hair maintenance such as different washing, styling and combing techniques are adapted, as an attempt to minimise trauma to loose anagen syndrome hairs. Young girls are also recommended to avoid activities such as extreme braiding. Caring for hair gently will minimise the amount of loosely anchored hairs being removed from scalp.

== History ==
The first published report on loose anagen syndrome was made in 1986 by Nodl and then by Zaun. Loose anagen syndrome was originally referred to as ‘syndrome of loosely attached hair in childhood’. The name ‘loose anagen syndrome’ was first adapted in 1989 by Price, Gummer, Hamm and Traupe in American literature. Early literature on loose anagen syndrome all reported identical findings. The genetic aspects and potential mechanisms for the cause of loose anagen syndrome was first discovered in 1992 by Baden, Kvedar and Magro. The ultrastructural changes in loose anagen hairs were examined by Mirmirani, Price and Uno.

== See also ==
- List of cutaneous conditions
