= Root sheath =

Root sheath may refer to any of these biological structures:

- Epithelial root sheath, a proliferation of epithelial cells located at the cervical loop of the enamel organ in a developing tooth
- Root sheath (hair), the inner or epidermic coat of the hair follicle that is closely adherent to the root of the hair
  - Inner root sheath
  - Outer root sheath
- Seed root sheath, a protective layer of tissue that surrounds the radicle in monocotyledon seeds
