= Short anagen syndrome =

- Specialty: Dermatology

Short anagen syndrome is a condition where hair does not grow beyond a short length, due to an unusually short duration of active hair growth (anagen phase). Most cases are associated with fine blond hair.

== Signs and symptoms ==
Short anagen syndrome appears as sporadic short hair, frequently with low hair density and no obvious alopecia patches. Oftentimes, parents worry that their child never needs a haircut or that their hair never gets long. The anagen phase lasts for only four to ten months. The hair cycle synchronizes when the anagen phase shortens, resulting in recurrent periods of severe hair loss.

== Causes ==
Although familial cases have been described, which may indicate an autosomal dominant inheritance, the condition is congenital and is believed to be sporadic.

== Diagnosis ==
As of right now, short anagen syndrome lacks diagnostic standards. Nonetheless, the diagnosis might be supported by the following six key clinical features:

1. Other than its length, the hair shaft is normal.
2. Normal hair density.
3. Absence of fragility in hair.
4. When separating it from loose anagen syndrome or telogen effluvium, the hair pull test is frequently normal.
5. Normal physical exam (skin, teeth, and nails).
6. Average physical and mental growth.

The diagnosis is confirmed by microscopic analysis of the hair, which displays short telogen hairs with tapering tips, indicating uncut hairs.

Differential diagnosis for short hair consists primarily of loose anagen syndrome (LAS), congenital hypotrichosis, and hair shaft diseases.

== Treatment ==
Topical minoxidil is known to prolong the anagen phase, enhance hair length, and prevent telogen effluvium as a therapeutic intervention; nevertheless, therapy is debatable and may not be required, at least in young children.

== See also ==
- Loose anagen syndrome
- List of cutaneous conditions
