= Sheath =

Sheath (pronounced /ʃiːθ/) may refer to:

== Biology ==
- Carotid sheath, a condensation of the deep cervical fascia enveloping multiple vital neurovascular structures of the neck
- Leaf sheath, a structure, typically at the base that fully or partially clasps the stem above the node, where the leaf is attached
- Myelin sheath, an insulating layer over the axon of a neuron
- Preputial sheath, a non-human mammal prepuce
  - Clitoral sheath a non-human mammal clitoral hood
  - Penile sheath, a non-human mammal foreskin
- Rectus sheath, a tough fibrous compartment formed by the aponeuroses of the transverse abdominal muscle and the internal and external oblique muscles
- Root sheath (disambiguation)
- Tendon sheath, a layer of synovial membrane around a tendon

== Objects ==
- Scabbard, a sheath for holding a sword, dagger, knife, or similar edged weapons
- The outer covering of an electrical cable
- Introducer sheath, a medical device
- Koteka, a penis sheath traditionally worn by native male inhabitants of some ethnic groups in New Guinea
- Sheath dress, a fitted, straight cut dress, often nipped at the waistline with no waist seam

== Other uses ==
- Debye sheath, a layer in a plasma which has a greater density of positive ions
- Heliosheath, the region of the heliosphere beyond the termination shock
- Kosha, a covering of the Atman according to Vedantic philosophy
- Sheath (album), a 2003 album by LFO
- Sheath (character), a character in Marvel Comics

== See also ==
- Sheaf (disambiguation)
- Sheathing (disambiguation)
- Sheave, a type of pulley
