= Sheaves =

Sheaves is the plural of either of two nouns:

- Sheaf, several uses
- Sheave, part of a pulley system
