= Sheathing =

Sheathing may refer to:

== Construction ==
- Exterior sheathing, a board or panel material installed over the exterior frame of a structure
- Floor sheathing, a board or panel material installed over the floor frame of a structure
- Housewrap, typically installed over the exterior sheathing of a wall
- Siding (construction), the outermost layer of a wall
- Rigid panel, a form of insulation that can be installed over or under housewrap
- Cladding (construction)

== Engineering and technology ==
- Copper sheathing, on a wooden ship's hull to protect against fouling and shipworm
- Sheathing as electrical insulation on a wire or cable, see electrical cable
- Sheathing as protection against physical damage, see armoured cable
- Sheathing to reduce heat transfer, see pipe insulation

== Other uses ==
- Sheathing, the action of putting a bladed weapon into a sheath or scabbard

== See also ==
- Cladding (disambiguation)
- Sheading, a historical division of the Isle of Man
- Sheath (disambiguation)
