= Lanceolate ending =

A lanceolate ending is a neuron ending that wraps around a hair follicle. Specific kinds of touch-sensing neurons in skin use them to respond to hair being touched or brushed. Lanceolate endings have been seen in all mammals thus far studied as of 2021. There are multiple kinds of lanceolate endings: in mice, for example, there is one for each of the three types of hair -- guard hair, awl hair, and zigzag hair.
