= Huxley's layer =

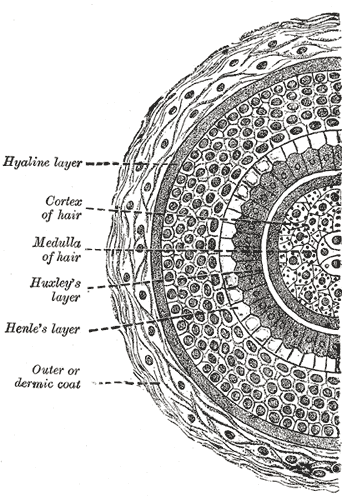
- Transverse section of hair follicle.

Identifiers
- FMA: 70939

Huxley's layer is the second layer of the inner root sheath of the hair and consists of one or two layers of horny, flattened, nucleated cells. It lies between Henle's layer and the cuticle.

== Naming ==
The layer is named after English biologist Thomas Henry Huxley.

== See also ==
- Thomas Huxley
- List of distinct cell types in the adult human body
