= CLAD =

CLAD may refer to:

- Centre de linguistique appliquée de Dakar, the language institute in Dakar, Senegal
- Certified LabVIEW Associate Developer
- Crosscultural, Language, and Academic Development, a certification program for Teaching English as a second language

== See also ==
- Cladding (disambiguation)
