= Housewrap =

Material used to protect buildings

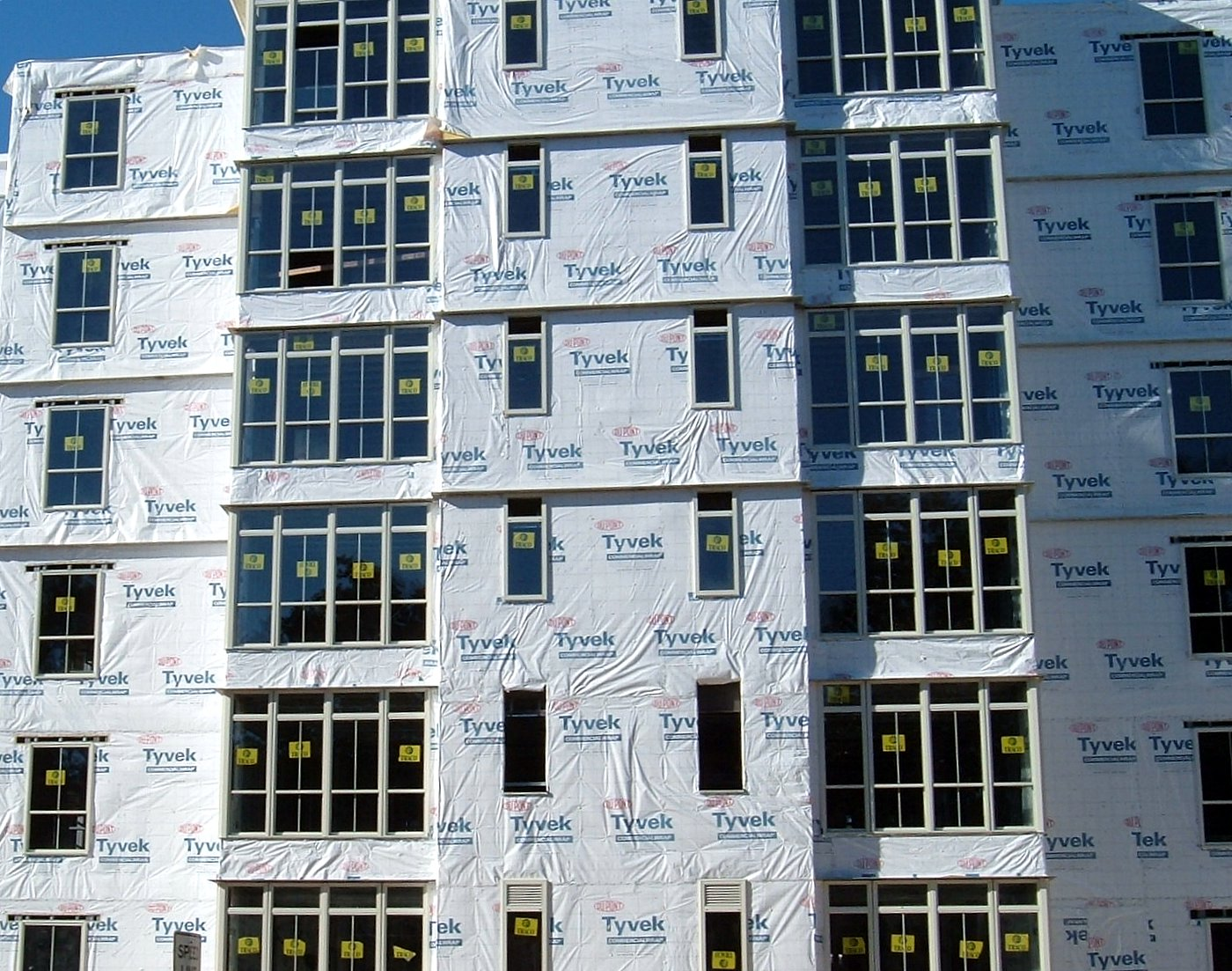
A building wrapped with Tyvek-brand housewrap during construction

Housewrap (or house wrap), also known by the genericized trademark homewrap (or home wrap), generally denotes a modern synthetic material used to protect buildings. Housewrap functions as a water-resistant layer, preventing rain or snow from getting into the wall assembly while allowing water vapor to pass to the exterior. Housewraps can only be exposed for a few months, as it is not a weather resistant layer, and weather elements including sunlight and temperature, can damage it. Furthermore, housewraps are not a form of insulation. If moisture from either direction is allowed to build up within stud or cavity walls, mold and rot can set in and fiberglass or cellulose insulation will lose its R-value because of the heat-conducting moisture. House wrap may also serve as an air barrier if it is sealed carefully at seams and supported to resist wind loads.

Housewrap is a replacement for the older tar paper or asphalt saturated felt on walls. It is lighter in weight, available in much wider rolls, stronger, and both faster and easier to apply.

== Major types ==
- Nonwoven fabric
- Micro-perforated, cross-lapped films
- Films laminated to spunbond nonwovens (Typar or CertaWrap)
- Films laminated or coated to polypropylene wovens
- Supercalendered, wetlaid polyethylene fibril nonwoven ("Tyvek")

== Installation ==
Housewrap is installed between the sheathing and the exterior siding, and is used behind vinyl, wood clapboards, shingles or shakes, brick, and other building materials. In all cases, the housewrap helps prevent water intrusion when liquid water gets past the siding and its trim and caulking.

As such, housewrap must be both water shedding and have a high moisture vapor transmission rate (MVTR) to be effective. It must also withstand abuse during installation, and because housewrap is often left exposed for some time before being cladded-over, it must hold up to wind and resist UV for 30 to 90 days. Some new designs must be installed carefully or they will rip or tear during installation, allowing for water infiltration at the damaged areas.

== Properties ==
- Typical MVTR ~200 grams/100 square-inches/24hours (or greater, i.e., Tyvek is ~400)
- Typical 2 ounces/square-yard (varies greatly with manufacturer)
- Typical width 9' (108)" on a 3" core
