= Cortex (hair) =

Hair layer located between the cuticle and the medulla

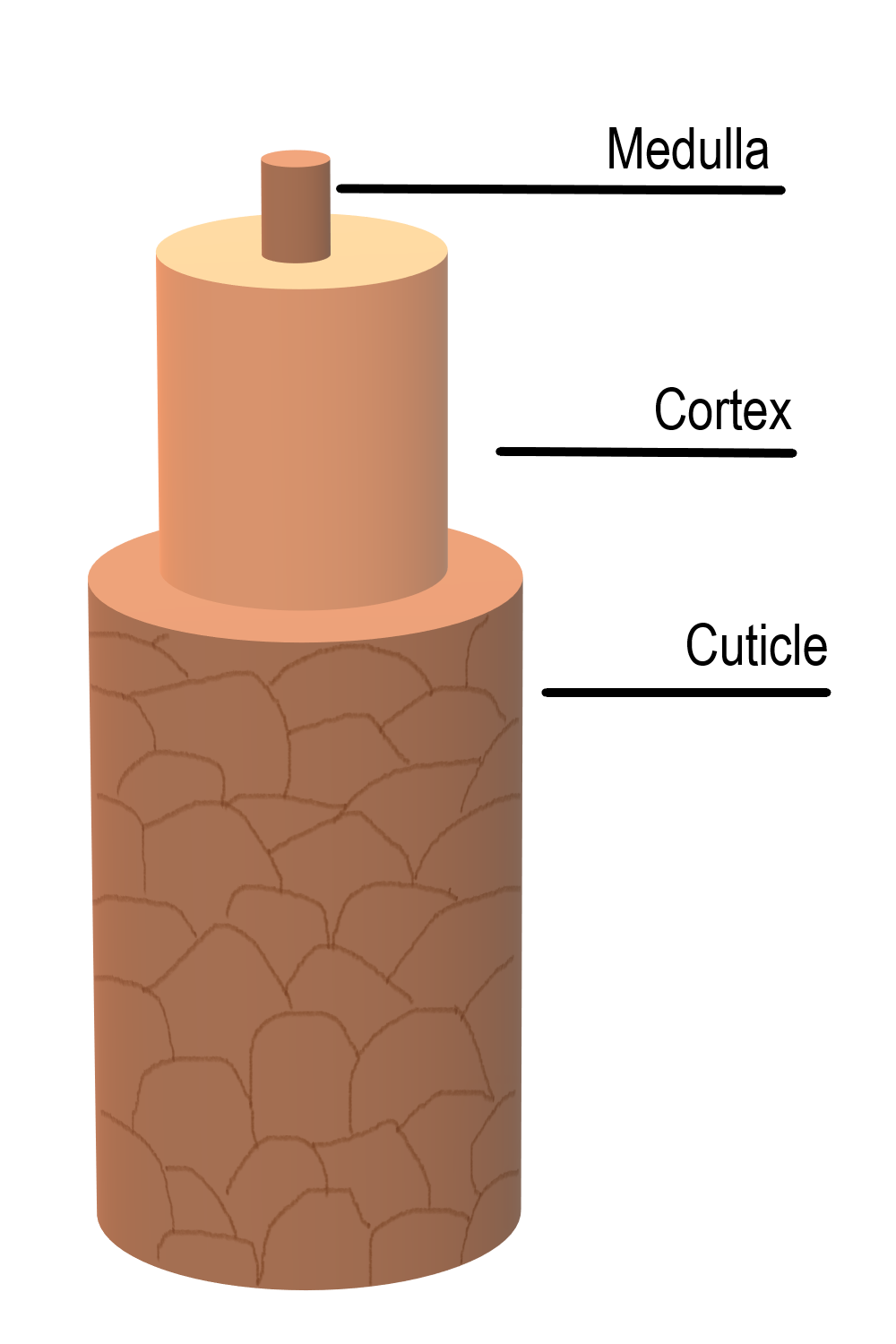
Diagram of the hair shaft, indicating medulla (innermost), cortex, and cuticle (exterior.)

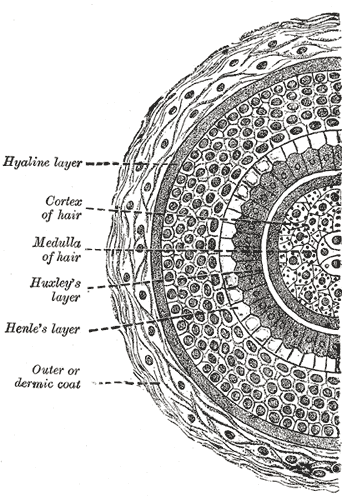
Anatomy of hair

The cortex of the hair shaft is located between the hair cuticle and medulla and is the thickest hair layer. It contains most of the hair's pigment, giving the hair its color. The major pigment in the cortex is melanin, which is also found in skin. The distribution of this pigment varies from animal to animal and person to person. In humans, the melanin is primarily denser nearer the cuticle whereas in animals, melanin is primarily denser nearer the medulla.
