= Arrector pili muscle =

Muscles attached to hair follicles

Details
- Nerve: Sympathetic postganglionic nerve fibers

Identifiers
- TA98: A16.0.00.024
- TA2: 7051
- TH: H3.12.00.3.01041
- FMA: 67821

The arrector pili muscles, also known as hair erector muscles, are small muscles attached to hair follicles in mammals. Contraction of these muscles causes the hairs to stand on end, known colloquially as goose bumps (piloerection).

== Structure ==
Each arrector pili is composed of a bundle of smooth muscle fibres which attach to several follicles (a follicular unit). Each is innervated by the sympathetic division of the autonomic nervous system. The muscle attaches to the follicular stem cell niche in the follicular bulge, splitting at their deep end to encircle the follicle.

== Function ==
The contraction of the muscle is involuntary. Stresses such as cold, fear etc. may stimulate the sympathetic nervous system, and thus cause muscle contraction.

=== Thermal insulation ===
Contraction of arrector pili muscles have a principal function in the majority of mammals of providing thermal insulation. Air becomes trapped between the erect hairs, helping the animal retain heat.

=== Self defense ===
Many animals experience contraction of the arrector pili muscle in response to a perceived threat. This helps the animal seem larger and more intimidating as a result.

=== Sebum excretion ===
Pressure exerted by the muscle may cause sebum to be forced along the hair follicle towards the surface, protecting the hair.

=== Hair follicle stability ===
Arrector pili muscles also stabilise the base of the hair follicle.

=== Clinical significance ===
Skin conditions such as leprosy can damage arrector pili muscles, preventing their contraction. Inducing contraction of the arrector pili muscles via an α1-adrenergic receptor agonist has been shown to reduce hair shedding as a result of traction alopecia.

== History ==
The term "arrector pili" comes from Latin. It translates to "hair erector".

== Additional images ==
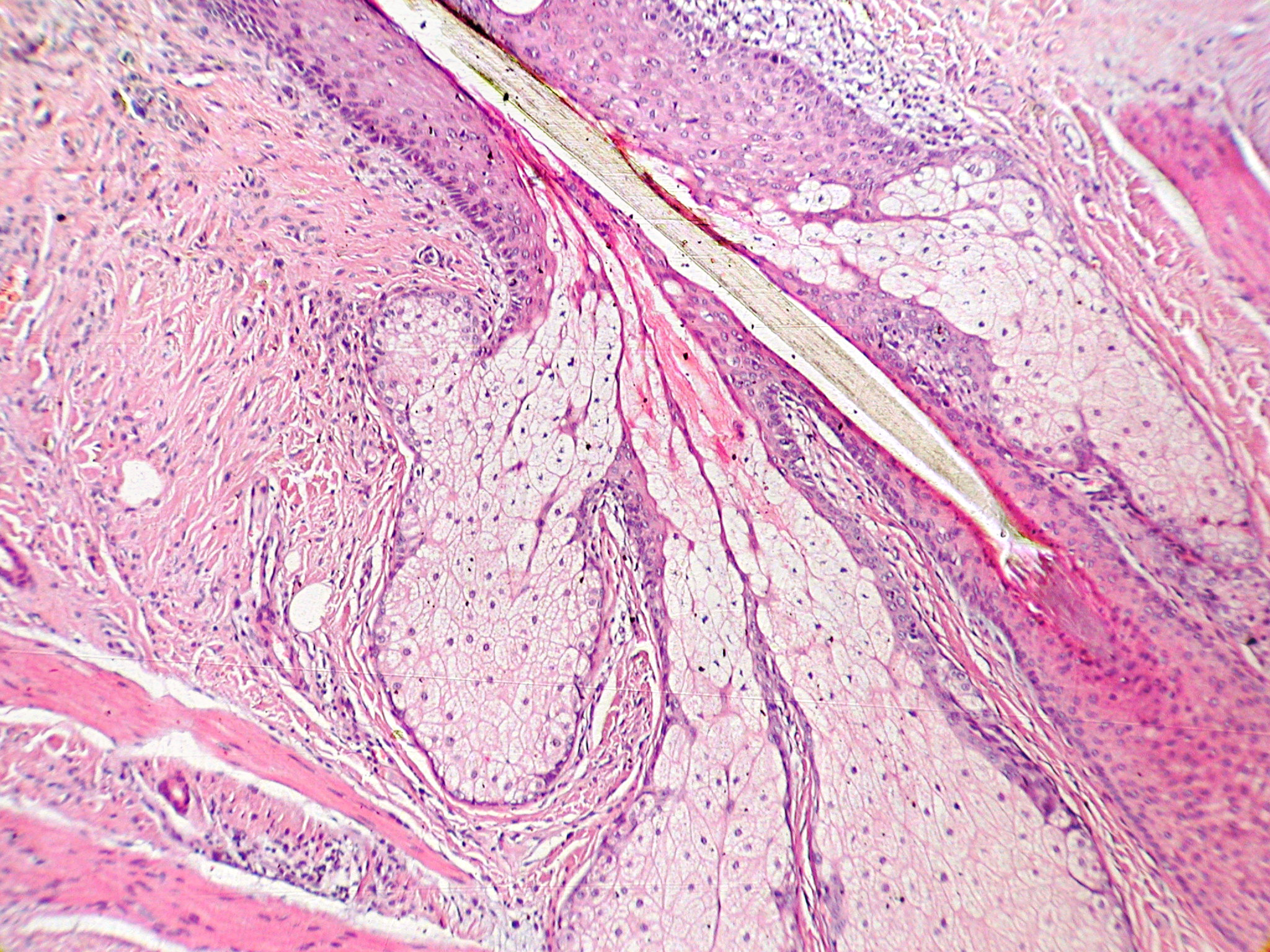
Insertion of sebaceous glands into hair shaft

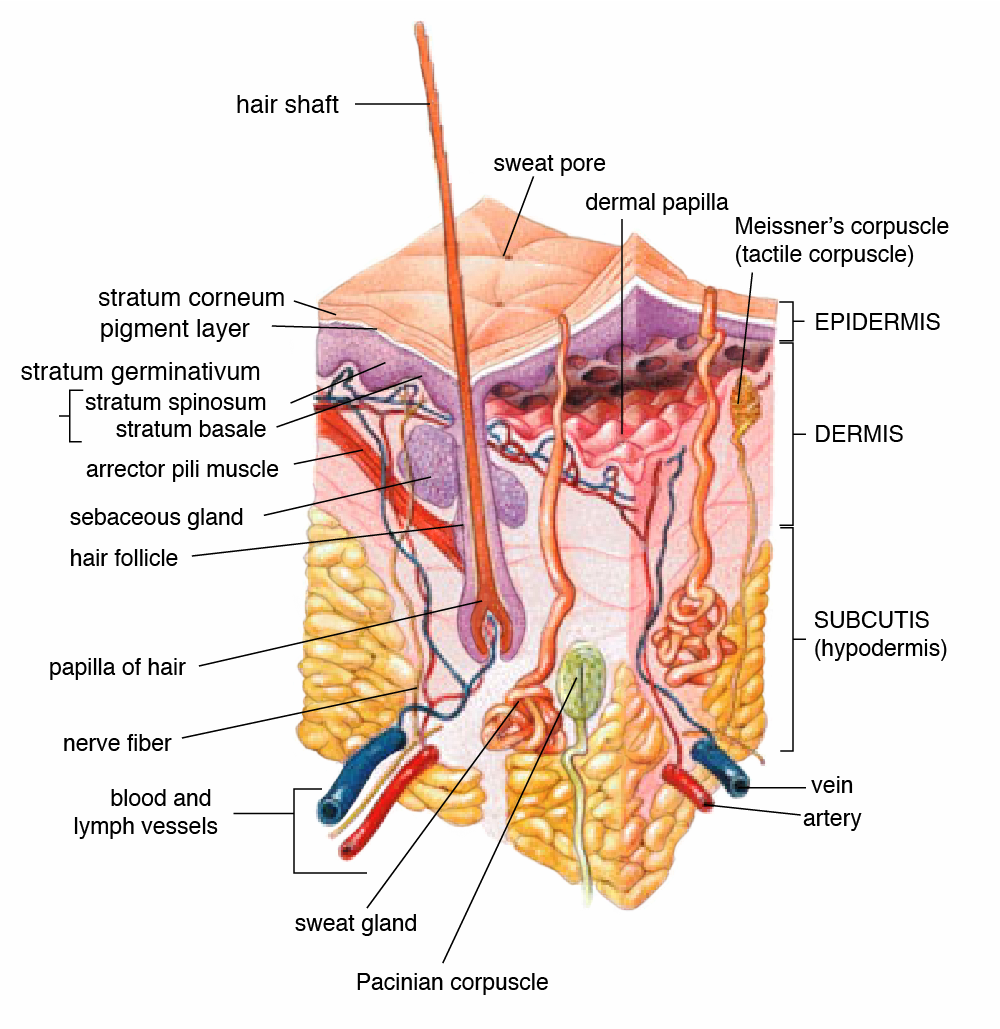
Cross-section of all skin layers
