= Cladding =

Cladding is an outer layer of material covering another. It may refer to the following:

- Cladding (boiler), the layer of insulation and outer wrapping around a boiler shell
- Cladding (construction), materials applied to the exterior of buildings
  - Wall cladding, exterior material applied to the walls of a building
  - Copper cladding, applying copper to the exterior of buildings
  - Rainscreen cladding, an exterior wall detail to create a capillary break and to allow drainage and evaporation of water
- Cladding (fiber optics), fiber optics property to contain light in the core of the fiber by total internal reflection
- Cladding (metalworking), a bonding together of dissimilar metals
- Cladding (nuclear fuel), the outer layer of the fuel rods, standing between the coolant and the nuclear fuel

== See also ==
- CLAD (disambiguation)
