= Sheaf =

Sheaf may refer to:

- Sheaf (agriculture), a bundle of harvested cereal stems
- Sheaf (mathematics), a mathematical object on a topological space
  - Sheaf on a site, a generalization to categories with a Grothendieck topology
- Sheaf toss, a Scottish sport
- River Sheaf, a tributary of the River Don in England
- The Sheaf, a student-run newspaper serving the University of Saskatchewan

== See also ==
- Sceafa, a king of English legend
- Sheath (disambiguation)
- Sheave, a wheel or roller with a groove along its edge for holding a belt, rope or cable
