= Cuticle (hair) =

Outermost part of a hair

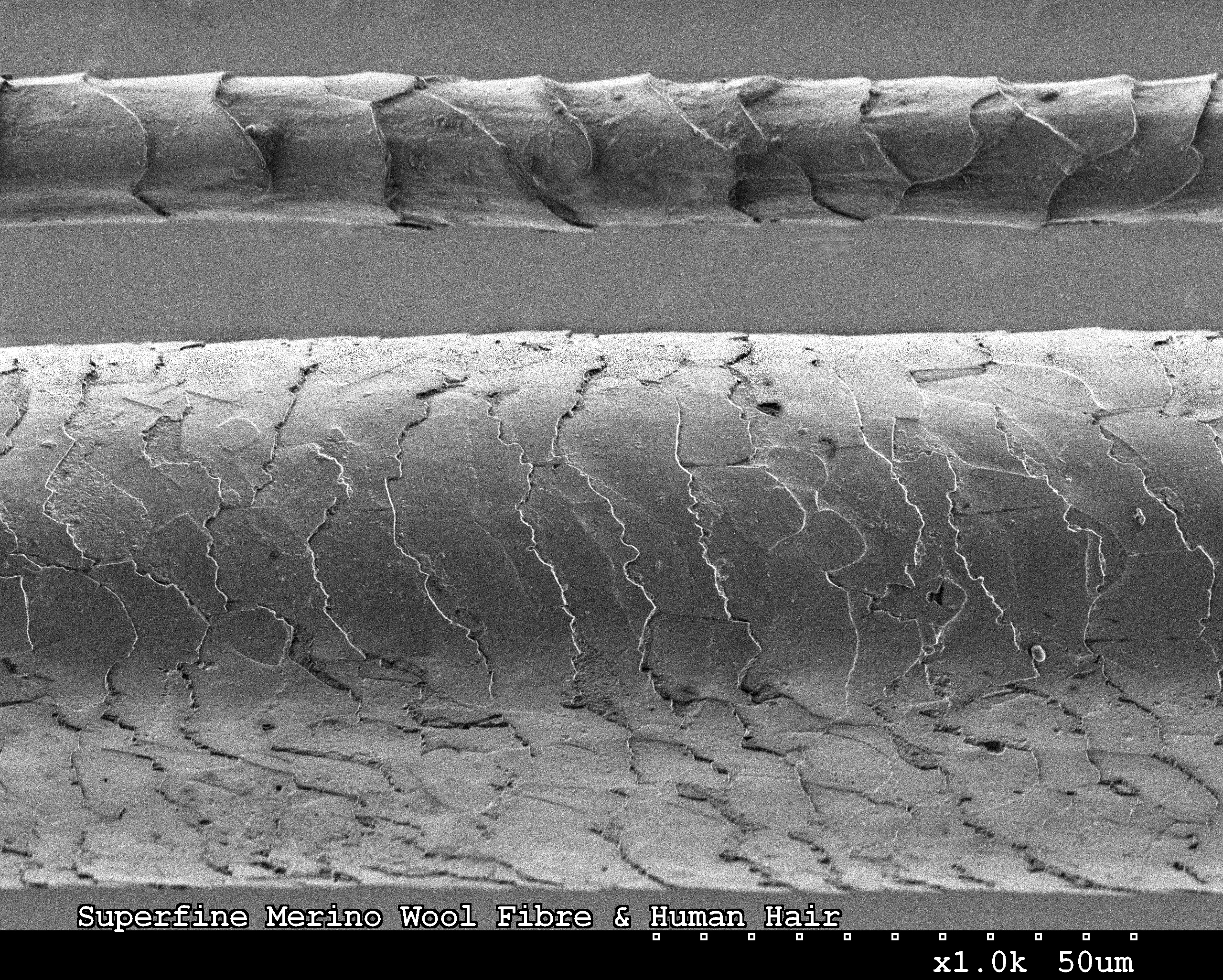
Comparison of sheep (top) and human (bottom) hairs with different cuticle textures

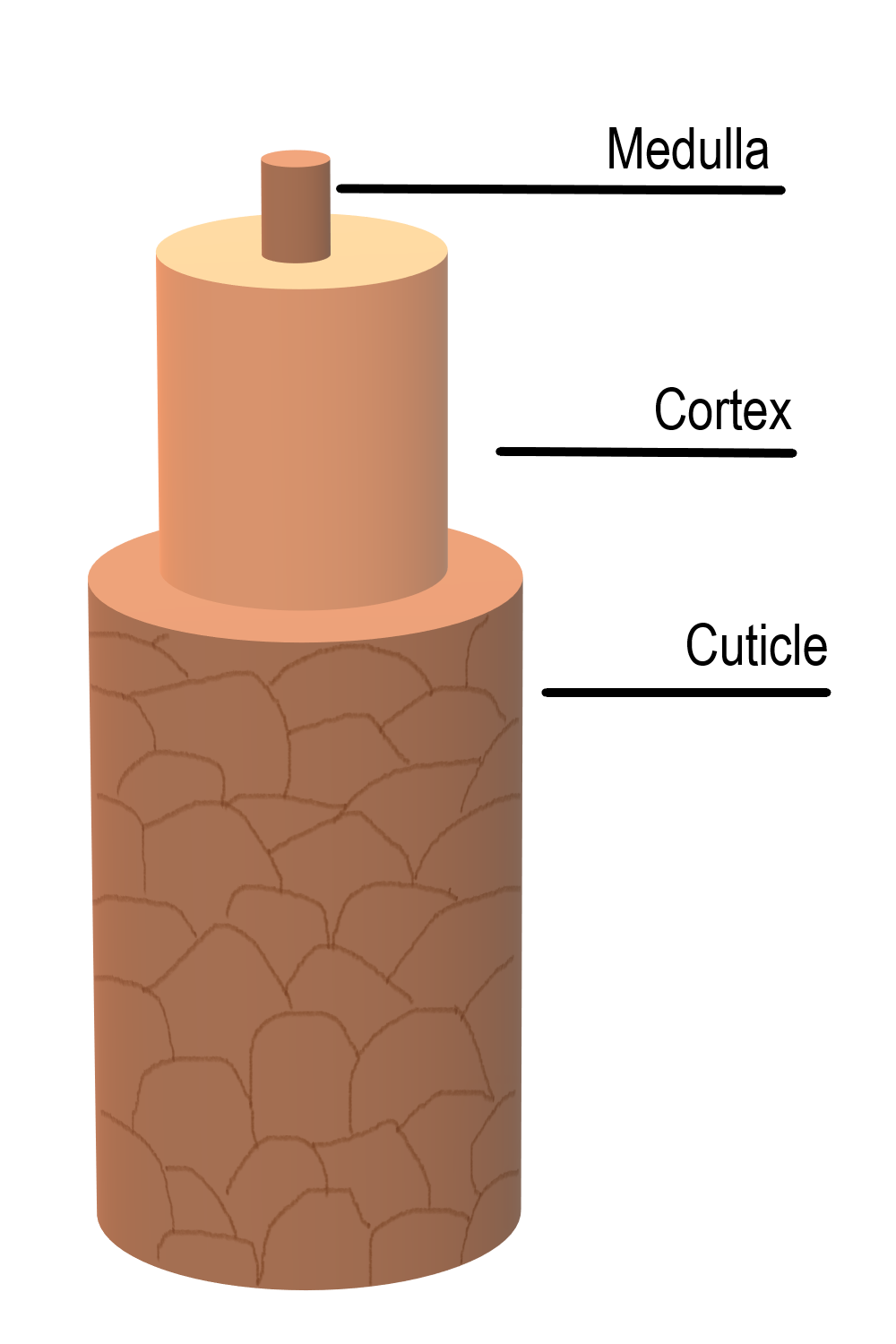
Diagram of the hair shaft, indicating medulla (innermost), cortex, and cuticle (exterior)

The hair cuticle is the outermost part of the hair shaft. It is formed from dead cells, overlapping in layers, which form scales that strengthen and protect the hair shaft.

These layers are formed of keratin proteins. The hair cuticle is also known to contain anteiso-18-methyleicosanoic acid which contribute to the hydrophobic properties of hair.

== Effect ==
While the cuticle is the outermost layer, it is not responsible for the color of the hair. Melanin is the pigment that gives hair its color and is found in the cortex.

== See also ==
- Inner root sheath
- Lanceolate ending
- List of distinct cell types in the adult human body
