= Outer root sheath =

Region of the hair follicle

The outer root sheath or external root sheath of the hair follicle encloses the inner root sheath and hair shaft. It is continuous with the basal layer of the interfollicular epidermis (skin).

== See also ==
List of distinct cell types in the adult human body
