= Hair follicle =

Organ found in mammalian skin

- Hair follicle

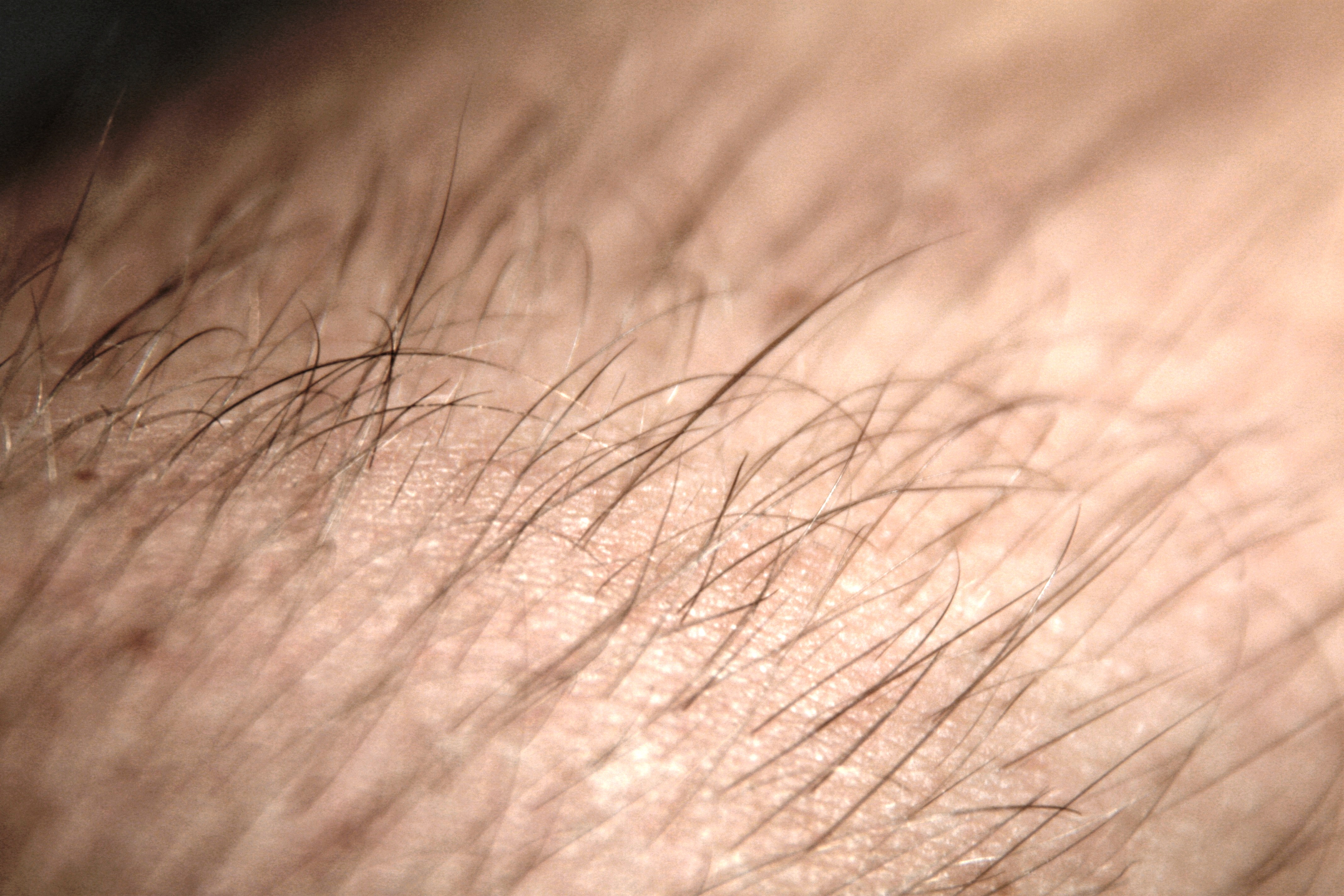
- A photograph of hair on a human arm emerging from follicles

Details
- System: Integumentary system
- Artery: Supratrochlear, supraorbital, superficial temporal, occipital
- Vein: Superficial temporal, posterior auricular, occipital
- Nerve: Supratrochlear, supraorbital, greater occipital, lesser occipital
- Lymph: Occipital, mastoid

Identifiers
- Latin: folliculus pili
- MeSH: D018859
- TA98: A16.0.00.023
- TA2: 7064
- TH: H3.12.00.3.01034
- FMA: 70660

The hair follicle is an organ found in mammalian skin. Residing in the dermal layer of the skin, each hair follicle is made up of 20 different types of mammalian cells, each with distinct functions. Hair follicles undergo a process of cellular differentiation.

The hair follicle regulates hair growth via a complex interaction between hormones, neuropeptides, and immune cells. This complex interaction induces the hair follicle to produce different types of hair as seen on different parts of the body. For example, terminal hairs grow on the scalp, and lanugo hairs are seen covering the bodies of fetuses in the uterus, some newborn babies, and oftentimes the bodies of humans with very low bodyweight, such as anorexics.

The process of hair growth occurs in distinct sequential stages: anagen is the active growth phase, catagen is the regression phase of the hair follicle, telogen is the resting stage, exogen is the active shedding of hair phase and kenogen is the phase between the empty hair follicle and the growth of new hair.

The function of hair in humans has long been a subject of interest and continues to be an important topic in society, developmental biology and medicine. Of all mammals, humans have the longest growth phase of scalp hair compared to hair growth on other parts of the body. For centuries, humans have ascribed esthetics to scalp hair styling and dressing and it is often used to communicate social or cultural norms in societies. In addition to its role in defining human appearance, scalp hair also provides protection from UV sun rays and is an insulator against extremes of hot and cold temperatures. Differences in the shape of the scalp hair follicle determine the observed ethnic differences in scalp hair appearance, length and texture.

There are many human diseases in which abnormalities in hair appearance, texture or growth are early signs of local disease of the hair follicle or systemic illness. Well known diseases of the hair follicle include alopecia or hair loss, hirsutism or excess hair growth and lupus erythematosus.

== Structure ==
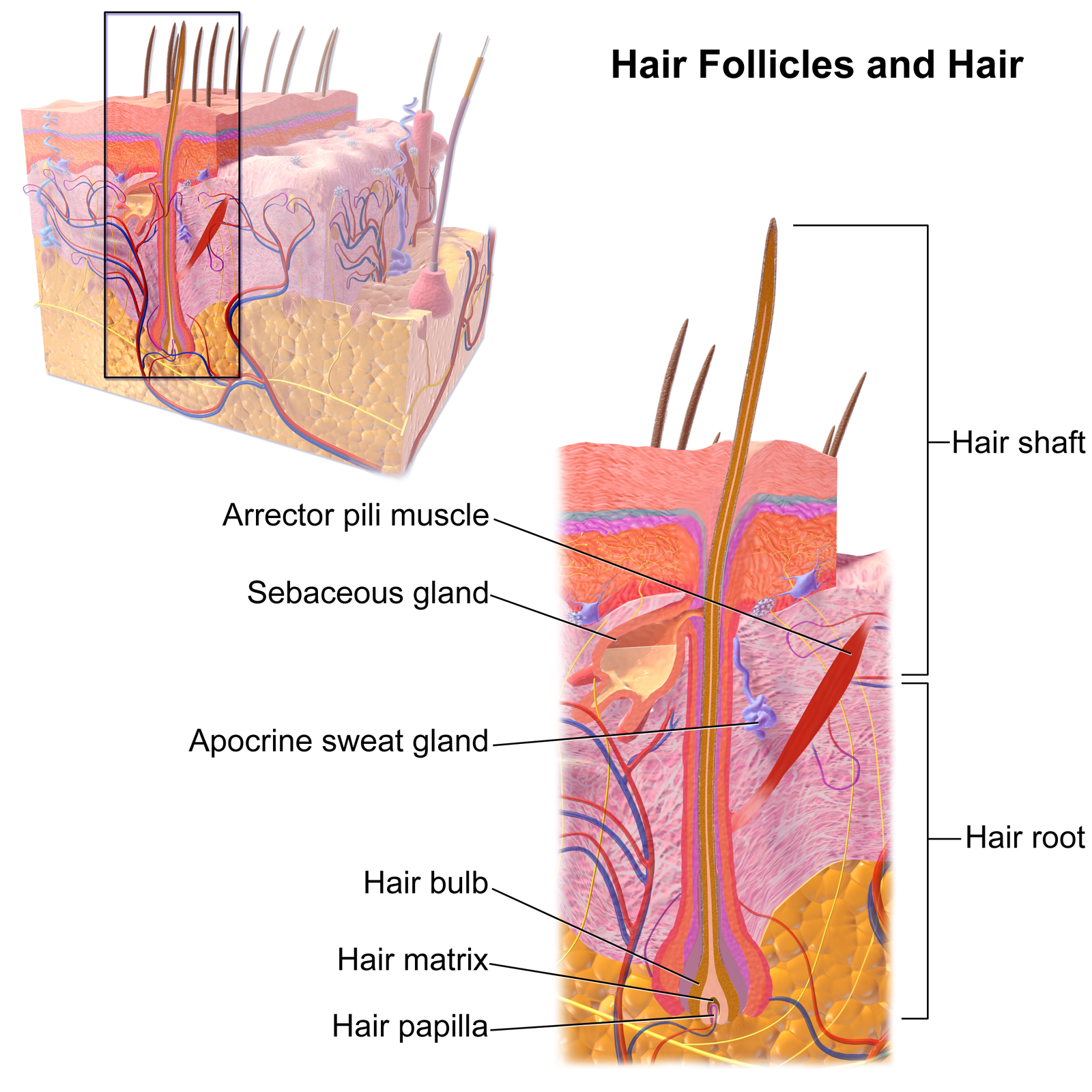
Structure of a hair follicle.

The position and distribution of hair follicles varies over the body. For example, the skin of the palms and soles does not have hair follicles whereas skin of the scalp, forearms, legs and genitalia has abundant hair follicles. There are many structures that make up the hair follicle. Anatomically, the triad of hair follicle, sebaceous gland and arrector pili muscle make up the pilosebaceous unit.

A hair follicle consists of :

- The papilla is a large structure at the base of the hair follicle. The papilla is made up mainly of connective tissue and a capillary loop. Cell division in the papilla is either rare or non-existent.
- Around the papilla is the hair matrix.
- A root sheath composed of an external and internal root sheath. The external root sheath appears empty with cuboid cells when stained with H&E stain. The internal root sheath is composed of three layers, Henle's layer, Huxley's layer, and an internal cuticle that is continuous with the outermost layer of the hair fiber.
- The bulge is located in the outer root sheath at the insertion point of the arrector pili muscle. It houses several types of stem cells, which supply the entire hair follicle with new cells, and take part in healing the epidermis after a wound. Stem cells express the marker LGR5+ in vivo.

Other structures associated with the hair follicle include the cup in which the follicle grows known as the infundibulum, the arrector pili muscles, the sebaceous glands, and the apocrine sweat glands. Hair follicle receptors sense the position of the hair.

Attached to the follicle is a tiny bundle of muscle fiber called the arrector pili. This muscle is responsible for causing the follicle lissis to become more perpendicular to the surface of the skin, and causing the follicle to protrude slightly above the surrounding skin (piloerection) and a pore encased with skin oil. This process results in goose bumps (or goose flesh).

Also attached to the follicle is a sebaceous gland, which produces the oily or waxy substance sebum. The higher the density of the hair, the more sebaceous glands that are found.

=== Variation ===
There are racial differences in several different hair characteristics. The differences in appearance and texture of hair are due to many factors: the position of the hair bulb relative to the hair follicle, size and shape of the dermal papilla, and the curvature of the hair follicle. The scalp hair follicle in people of European descent is elliptical in shape and, therefore, produces straight or wavy hair, whereas the scalp hair follicle of people of African descent is more curvy, resulting in the growth of tightly curled hair.

Terminal Scalp Hair Characteristics by Race
Race	diameter (micrometers)	cross-sectional shape	appearance
Blonde-haired white	40–80	oval to elliptical	wavy to curly
Dark brown/black haired/red haired white	50–90	oval to elliptical	wavy to curly
Black	60–100	elliptical and ribbon-like	kinky
Asian	80–100	circular	straight

Terminal Scalp Hair Characteristics by Taxon
Animal	diameter (micrometers)	cross-sectional shape	appearance
Chimpanzee	101-113	circular	straight
Orangutan	140-170	circular	straight
Buffalo	110	circular	straight

=== Development ===
In utero, the epithelium and underlying mesenchyme interact to form hair follicles.

==== Aging ====
A key aspect of hair loss with age is the aging of the hair follicle. Ordinarily, hair follicle renewal is maintained by the stem cells associated with each follicle. Aging of the hair follicle appears to be primed by a sustained cellular response to the DNA damage that accumulates in renewing stem cells during aging. This damage response involves the proteolysis of type XVII collagen by neutrophil elastase in response to the DNA damage in the hair follicle stem cells. Proteolysis of collagen leads to elimination of the damaged cells and then to terminal hair follicle miniaturization.

== Hair growth ==
Hair-follicle cycling

Hair follicle

Hair grows in cycles of various phases: anagen is the growth phase; catagen is the involuting or regressing phase; and telogen, the resting or quiescent phase (names derived using the Greek prefixes ana-, kata-, and telos- meaning up, down, and end respectively). Each phase has several morphologically and histologically distinguishable sub-phases. Prior to the start of cycling is a phase of follicular morphogenesis (formation of the follicle). There is also a shedding phase, or exogen, that is independent of anagen and telogen in which one or several hairs that might arise from a single follicle exits. Normally up to 85% of the hair follicles are in anagen phase, while 10–14% are in telogen and 1–2% in catagen. The cycle's length varies on different parts of the body. For eyebrows, the cycle is completed in around 4 months, while it takes the scalp 3–4 years to finish; this is the reason eyebrow hair have a much shorter length limit compared to hair on the head. Growth cycles are controlled by a chemical signal like epidermal growth factor. DLX3 is a crucial regulator of hair follicle differentiation and cycling.

=== Anagen phase ===
Anagen is the active growth phase of hair follicles during which the root of the hair is dividing rapidly, adding to the hair shaft. During this phase the hair grows about 1 cm every 28 days. A hair pulled out in this phase will typically have the root sheath attached to it which appears as a clear gel coating the first few mm of the hair from its base; this may be misidentified as the follicle, the root or the sebaceous gland by non-health care professionals. Scalp hair stays in this active phase of growth for 2–7 years; this period is genetically determined. At the end of the anagen phase an unknown signal causes the follicle to go into the catagen phase.

=== Catagen phase ===
The catagen phase is a short transition stage that occurs at the end of the anagen phase. It signals the end of the active growth of a hair. This phase lasts for about 2–3 weeks while the hair converts to a club hair, which is formed during the catagen phase when the part of the hair follicle in contact with the lower portion of the hair becomes attached to the hair shaft. A bulb of keratin attaches to the bottom tip of the hair and keeps it in place while a new hair begins to grow below it. A hair pulled out in this phase will have the bulb of keratin attached to it which appears as a small white ball on the end of the hair. This process cuts the hair off from its blood supply and from the cells that produce new hair. When a club hair is completely formed, about a 2-week process, the hair follicle enters the telogen phase.

=== Telogen phase ===
The telogen phase is the resting phase of the hair follicle, about three months. When the body is subjected to extreme stress, as much as 70 percent of hair can prematurely enter the telogen phase and begin to fall, causing a noticeable loss of hair. This condition is called telogen effluvium. The club hair is the final product of a hair follicle in the telogen stage, and is a dead, fully keratinized hair. Fifty to one-hundred club hairs are shed daily from a normal scalp.

=== Timeline ===
- Scalp: The time these phases last varies from person to person. Different hair color and follicle shape affects the timings of these phases.
  - Anagen phase, 2–8 years (occasionally much longer)
  - Catagen phase, 2–3 weeks
  - Telogen phase, around 3 months
- Eyebrows:
  - Anagen phase, 4–7 months
  - Catagen phase, 3–4 weeks
  - Telogen phase, about 9 months

== Clinical significance ==
=== Disease ===
There are many human diseases in which abnormalities in hair appearance, texture or growth are early signs of local disease of the hair follicle or systemic illness. Well known diseases of the hair follicle include alopecia or hair loss, hirsutism or excess hair growth, and lupus erythematosus. Therefore, understanding the function of the normal hair follicle is fundamental to diagnosing and treating many dermatologic and systemic diseases with hair abnormalities. Studies of Witka et al. 2020 has shown the role of microbiome in the biology, immunology and diseases of scalp hair follicle. Studies further shown that change in hair follicle microbiome result into scalp disease like; Seborrheic dermatitis of the scalp and dandruff, Folliculitis decalvans, Androgenetic alopecia, Scalp psoriasis and Alopecia areata.

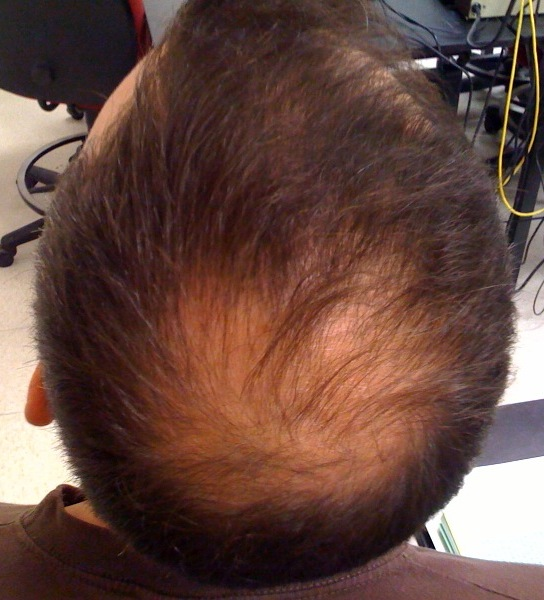
male alopecia

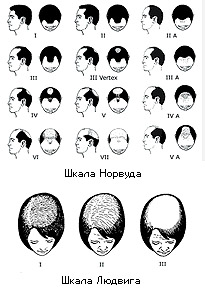
Alopecia scale

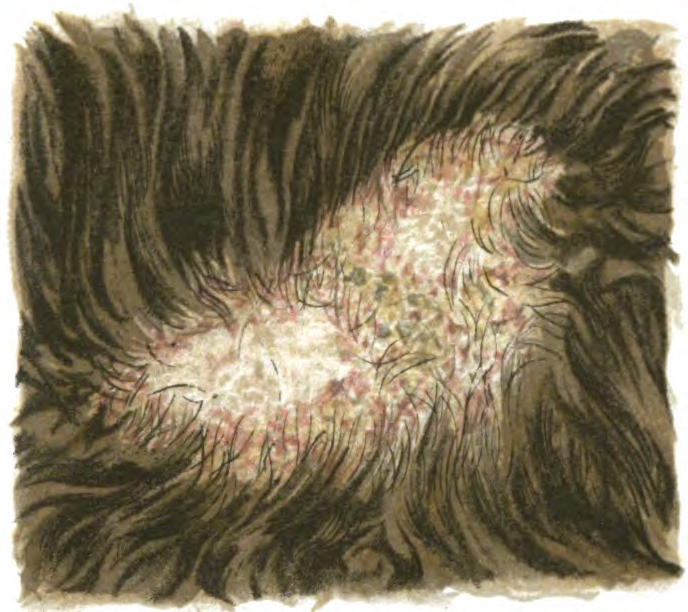
Lupus erythematosus

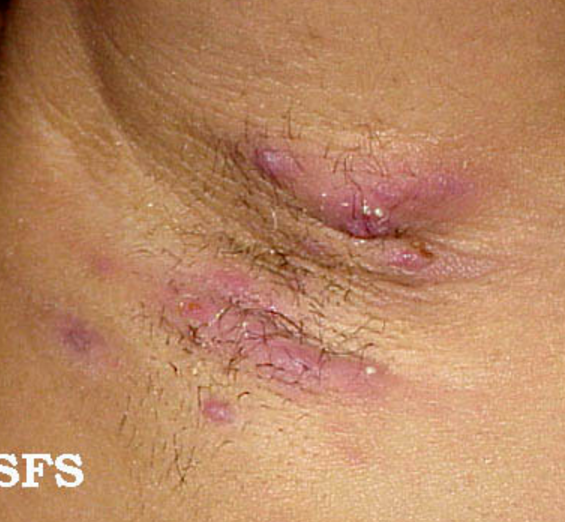
Hidradenitis suppurativa

==== Follicular occlusion tetrad ====
The follicular occlusion tetrad (FOT) refers to a group of four chronic, relapsing inflammatory disorders of the hair follicle. These conditions share a common pathophysiological mechanism of follicular hyperkeratinization, followed by follicular occlusion. These disorders often coexist or occur sequentially in the same patient and are characterized by recurrent abscess formation, sinus tract development, and scarring in regions rich in apocrine glands.

The tetrad comprises four interrelated disorders, each involving follicular occlusion, rupture, and secondary inflammation.

- Hidradenitis suppurativa (HS): Chronic, relapsing inflammation of hair follicles in apocrine-bearing areas, producing nodules, abscesses, and sinus tracts.
- Acne conglobata: Severe nodulocystic acne with interconnected abscesses and scarring, often involving the trunk and face.
- Dissecting cellulitis of the scalp: Suppurative scalp disorder characterized by painful nodules and scarring alopecia.
- Pilonidal disease: Recurrent sinus formation in the sacrococcygeal region caused by follicular occlusion and inflammation.

=== Hair restoration ===
Hair follicles form the basis of the two primary methods of hair transplantation in hair restoration, Follicular Unit Transplantation (FUT) and follicular unit extraction (FUE). In each of these methods, naturally occurring groupings of one to four hairs, called follicular units, are extracted from the hair restoration patient and then surgically implanted in the balding area of the patient's scalp, known as the recipient area. These follicles are extracted from donor areas of the scalp, or other parts of the body, which are typically resistant to the miniaturization effects of the hormone DHT. It is this miniaturization of the hair shaft that is the primary predictive indicator of androgenetic alopecia, commonly referred to as male pattern baldness or male hair loss. When these DHT-resistant follicles are transplanted to the recipient area, they continue to grow hair in the normal hair cycle, thus providing the hair restoration patient with permanent, naturally-growing hair.

While hair transplantation dates back to the 1950s, and plucked human hair follicle cell culture in vitro to the early 1980s, it was not until 1995 when hair transplantation using individual follicular units was introduced into medical literature.
