= Henle's layer =

Hair follicle layer

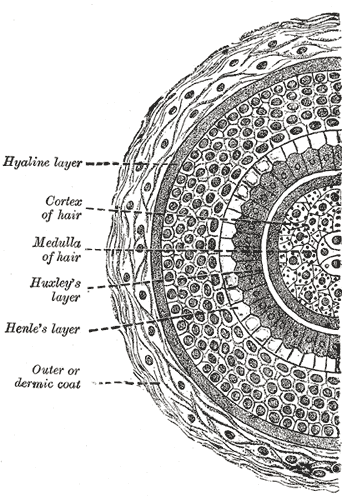
- Transverse section of hair follicle.

Identifiers
- FMA: 70938

Henle's layer is the third and the outermost layer of the inner root sheath of the hair follicle, consisting of a single layer of cubical cells with clear flattened nuclei. It is named after German physician, pathologist and anatomist Friedrich Gustav Jakob Henle.

== See also ==
List of distinct cell types in the adult human body
