= Inner root sheath =

Region of hair follicle

The inner root sheath or internal root sheath of the hair follicle is located between the outer root sheath and the hair shaft. It is made of three layers: Henle's layer, Huxley's layer, and the cuticle. The inner root sheath serves to protect growing hair.

== Description ==
Henle's layer is the outermost layer of the inner root sheath, consisting of a single row of cubical cells. During his original examination, Henle believed the layer lacked nuclei because he viewed it at a level where it had already cornified. Huxley's layer is in the middle, made up of approximately two rows of flattened cells with granular protoplasm. The cuticle of the root sheath is in the center, continuous with the outermost layer of the hair fiber.
