= Medulla (hair) =

Innermost layer of the hair

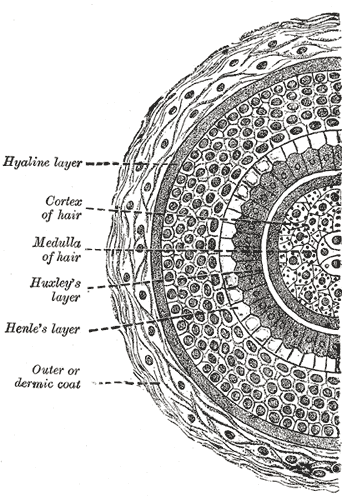
Anatomy of hair

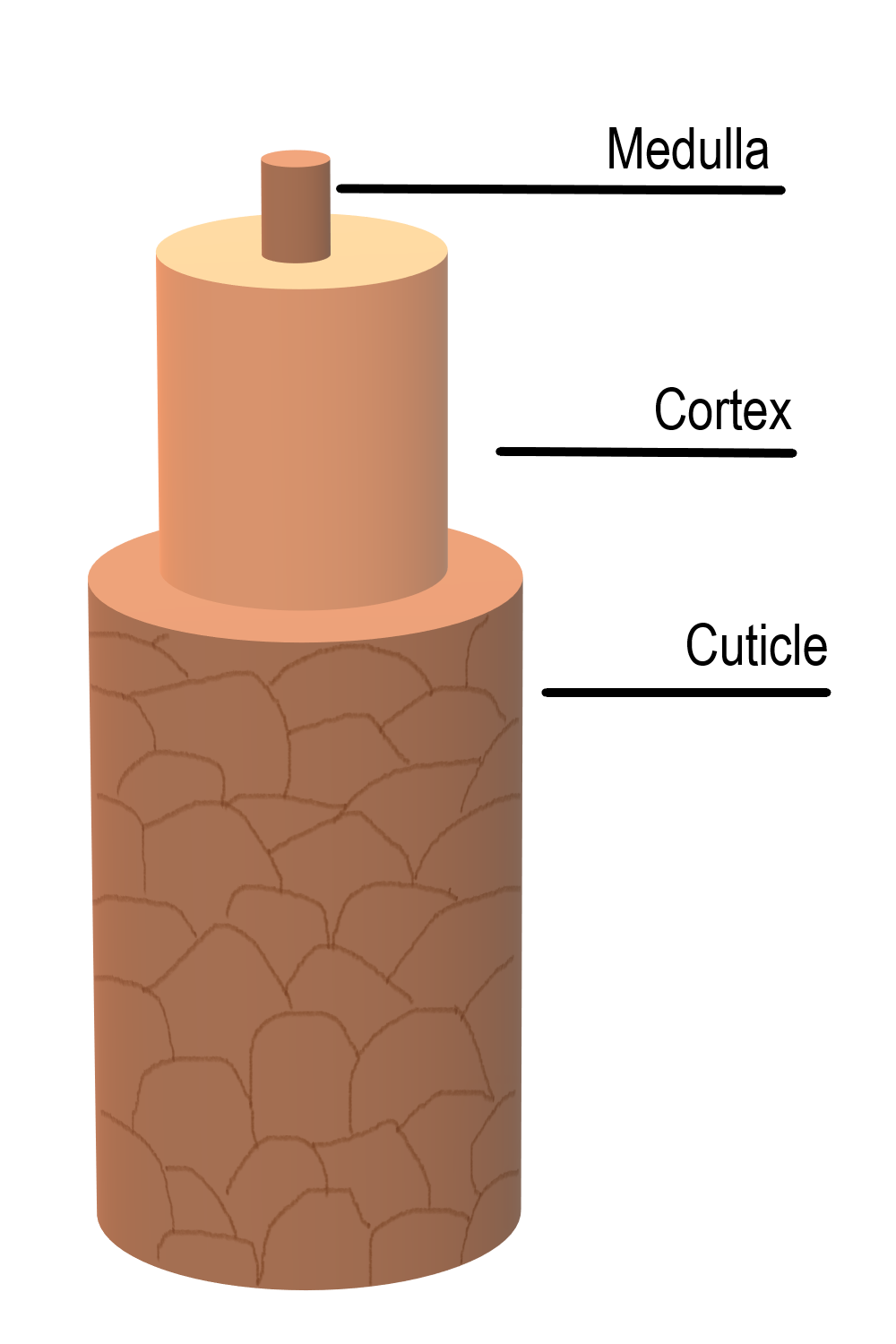
Diagram of the hair shaft, indicating medulla (innermost), cortex, and cuticle (exterior.)

The medulla is the innermost layer of the hair shaft. This nearly invisible layer is the most soft and fragile, and serves as the pith or marrow of the hair. Some mammals don't have a medulla in their hair. The presence or absence of this layer and the characteristics of the medulla can aid taxonomists in identifying what taxa a hair comes from. Characteristics include whether the medulla contains air pockets as well as the histology of the medulla.

Scientists are still uncertain about the exact role of the medulla, but they speculate that it is primarily an extension that is more prominent in depigmented (grey or white) hair .

Light refracted by the hair medulla appears to vary among populations.

== See also ==
List of distinct cell types in the adult human body
