= IgSF CAM =

Cell adhesion molecules in the immunoglobulin superfamily

Immunoglobulin-like adhesion molecules

Identifiers
- Symbol: IgSF CAM
- Membranome: 221

IgSF CAMs (Immunoglobulin-like Cell Adhesion Molecules) are cell adhesion molecules that belong to Immunoglobulin superfamily. It is regarded as the most diverse superfamily of CAMs. This family is characterized by their extracellular domains containing Ig-like domains. The Ig domains are then followed by Fibronectin type III domain repeats and IgSFs are anchored to the membrane by a GPI moiety. This family is involved in both homophilic or heterophilic binding and has the ability to bind integrins or different IgSF CAMs.

== Examples ==
Junctional adhesion molecules

Identifiers
- Symbol: JAM
- InterPro: IPR029871
- Membranome: 212
Available protein structures:
- PDB: IPR029871
- AlphaFold: IPR029871

Here is a list of some molecules of this family:

- NCAMs Neural Cell Adhesion Molecules
- ICAM-1 Intercellular Cell Adhesion Molecule
- VCAM-1 Vascular Cell Adhesion Molecule
- PECAM-1 Platelet-endothelial Cell Adhesion Molecule
- MAdCAM-1 Mucosal Vascular Addressin Cell Adhesion Molecule
- L1 family including L1 (protein), CHL1, Neurofascin and NrCAM
- SIGLEC family including Myelin-associated glycoprotein (MAG, SIGLEC-4), CD22 and CD83
- CTX family including CTX, Junctional adhesion molecule (JAM), BT-IgSF, Coxsackie virus and adenovirus receptor (CAR), VSIG, ESAM
- Nectins and related proteins, including CADM1 and other Synaptic Cell Adhesion Molecules
- CD2
- CD48
- HEPACAM
- HEPACAM2
- DSCAM - Down syndrome cell adhesion molecule
