= X-linked complicated corpus callosum dysgenesis =

- Other names: X-linked complicated corpus callosum agenesis, X-linked partial corpus callosum agenesis, X-linked partial agenesis of corpus callosum.
- Specialty: Medical genetics
- Types: This condition is part of the L1 spectrum disorders, also known as L1 syndrome.
- Causes: genetic mutation
- Prevention: none
- Prognosis: Medium
- Frequency: rare
- Deaths: 3 (reported)

X-linked complicated corpus callosum dysgenesis is a genetic disorder characterized by dysplasia, hypoplasia or agenesis of the corpus callosum alongside variable intellectual disability and spastic paraplegia. Only 13 cases (all male) have been described in medical literature. Transmission is X-linked recessive. It is the mildest subtype of L1 syndrome.

This condition differs from other L1 syndromes due to the fact that neither hydrocephalus, adducted thumbs, or speech difficulties are common in patients with the condition.

== Genetics ==
This condition is caused by X-linked recessive mutations in the L1CAM gene, located in the long arm of the X chromosome. Mutations involved in the milder variants of L1 syndrome (including X-linked complicated corpus callosum dysgenesis) usually work by changing the L1 protein structure.

== Cases ==
The following list comprises all cases of X-linked complicated corpus callosum dysgenesis described in medical literature (from OMIM):

- 1964: Menkes et al. describes 5 males from 4 sibships of a 2-generation American family. The males (all infants) had partial corpus callosum agenesis, severe intellectual disabilities, developmental delays, and epilepsy. The disorder first manifested right after birth, with recurrent seizures occurring hours after it. Out of these 5 babies, 3 had died. Post-mortem examination of one of the dead infants revealed chemical and anatomical abnormalities.
- 1983: Kaplan et al. describes 2 males from a 2-generation Canadian family. The proband was a 2 year old male, the first-born child of healthy, non-consanguineous Ashkenazi Jewish parents in their mid-20s, his pregnancy was uneventful (besides slight vaginal bleeding experienced by the mother sometime during her first three months of pregnancy). He was noted to have unilateral congenital ptosis, clinodactyly affecting the index and ring fingers, bilateral thumb adduction, and upper limb weakness at birth, with symptoms of Hirschsprung's disease showing 24 hours after he was born. He was psychomotorly delayed. CT scans showed brain growth delay, corpus callosum agenesis, and a hypoplastic inferior vermis and cerebellum. Electroencephalograms gave abnormal results. He was born weighing 3.09 kilograms, being 49 cm long, and with a head circumference of 33.5 cm. The second case was his 24-year-old maternal uncle. He was psychomotorly delayed like his nephew, and he noted to have pectus excavatum and speckled irises only. CT scans showed only corpus callosum agenesis. His head circumference at the time was 52 cm. Chromosomal analysis done on the proband child, his mother and his uncle was normal. Family history on the mother's family only revealed a distant third-cousin with Hirschsprung's disease, her two other brothers were normal, and she went on to have a normal female pregnancy.
- 1992: Kang et al. describes 4 male children each from 4 different sibships belonging to an ethnic Chinese Taiwanese family, constituting the first case report of X-linked complicated corpus callosum dysgenesis in China. Said children had microcephaly, spasticity, intellectual disabilities, hydrocephalus, and facial dysmorphisms. Some of them had an interhemispheric cyst.
- 2006: Basel-Vanagaite et al. describes 2 Israeli Jewish brothers who both had partial corpus callosum agenesis alongside mild intellectual disability. One of the siblings had bilateral congenital radial head dislocation and Hirschsprung's disease. Genetic testing revealed a missense mutation (p.P240L) in exon 7 of the L1CAM gene.
