= Neuronal self-avoidance =

Property of neurons

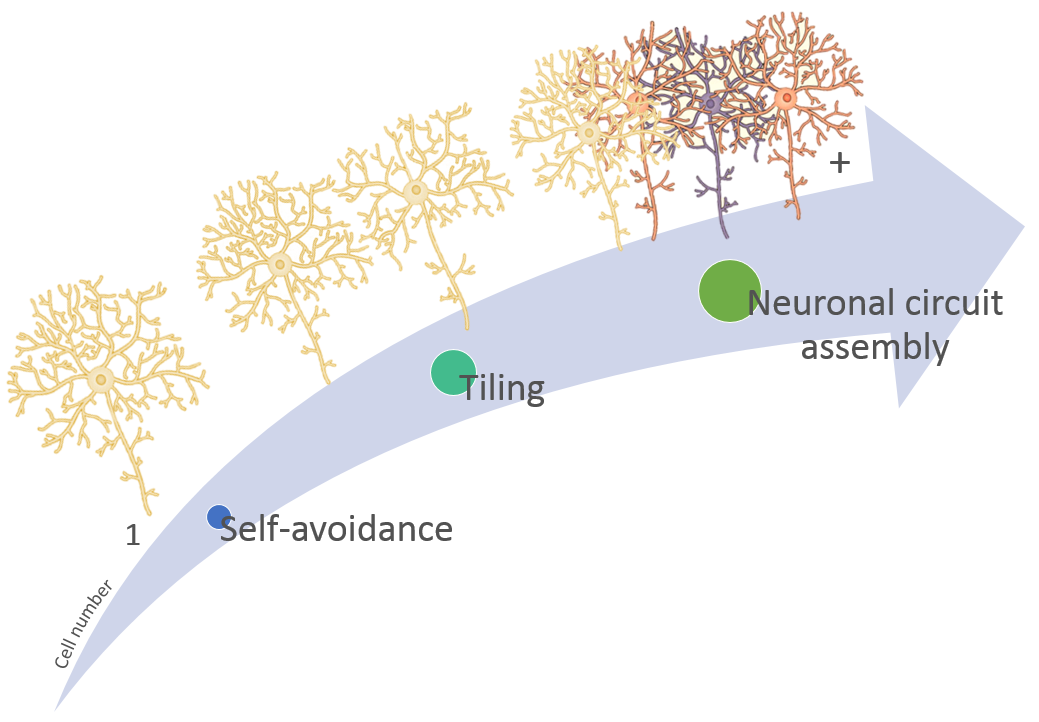
Figure 2. Mechanisms of neural development dependent of neuronal self-recognition. Self-avoidance ensures that there is no overlap of isoneural branches and is at the basis of neuronal circuit assembly.

Neuronal self-avoidance, or isoneural avoidance, is an important property of neurons which consists in the tendency of branches (dendrites and axons) arising from a single soma (also called isoneuronal or sister branches) to turn away from one another. The arrangements of branches within neuronal arbors are established during development and result in minimal crossing or overlap as they spread over a territory, resulting in the typical fasciculated morphology of neurons (Fig 1).

In opposition, branches from different neurons can overlap freely with one another. This propriety demands that neurons are able to discriminate "self", which they avoid, from "non-self" branches, with which they coexist. This neuronal self-recognition is attained through families of cell recognition molecules which work as individual barcodes, allowing the discrimination of any other nearby branch as either "self" or "non-self".

Self-avoidance ensures that dendritic territories are covered completely and yet non-redundantly guaranteeing that branches achieve functionally appropriate coverage of input or output territories.

Neuronal communication requires the coordinated assembly of axons, dendrites, and synapses. Therefore, self-avoidance is necessary for proper neuronal wiring and postnatal development and, together with neuronal tiling (heteroneuronal avoidance), is a crucial spacing mechanism for patterning neural circuits that results in complete and nonredundant innervation of sensory or synaptic space.

== History ==
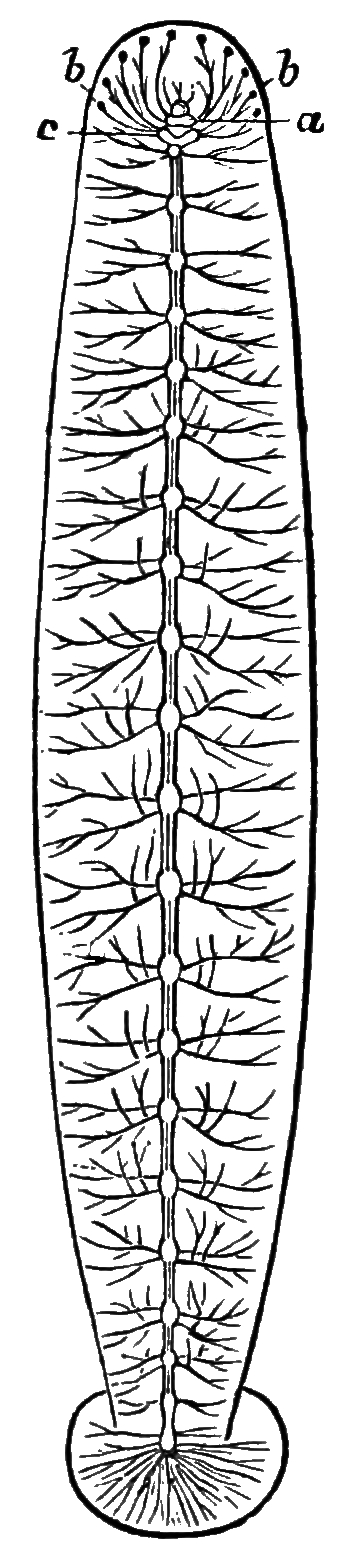
Figure 3. Nervous system of the medicinal leech (H. medicilanis)

The concept of neuronal self-avoidance emerged about 50 years ago. The pioneer studies were performed in the leech, focusing on the central nervous system and developing mechanosensory neurons. Leeches from two species: Hirudo medicinalis and Haementeria ghilianii, remained the main organism for the study of the question of neuronal self-recognition and self-avoidance. In this animal, the repeating segmental pattern of the nervous system along with the fact that neurons are relatively few in number, and many are large enough to be recognized allowed the experimental study of the general problem of neuronal specificity. In 1968, through the mapping of mechanoreceptor axonal receptive fields in H. medicilalis, Nicholls and Baylor revealed distinct types of boundaries between axons from the same or different types of neurons, and also between individual neurons. They observed that receptive fields were subdivided into discrete areas, innervated by the different branches of a single cell. These boundaries, unlike those between adjacent fields of different cells, were abrupt showing nearly no overlap. The authors then suggested a mechanism for the spatial arrangement of axons in which "a fiber might repel other branches more strongly if they arise from the same cell than if they come from a homologue, and not at all if they come from a cell with a different modality". In 1976, Yau confirmed their findings and proposed that the branches of a cell recognized each other, therefore avoiding to grow into the same territory and establishing the discrete areas that Nicholls and Baylor observed. It was then clear that mechanosensory neurons, in leech, show self-avoidance: with the repulsion between branches originating from the same cell, but they did not show class-avoidance, meaning that branches from the same type of neurons could overlap.

The phenomena was recognized but a lot remained unknown, including the term "Self-avoidance" which arises in 1982/1983 with the studies of Kramer. In 1982, Kramer postulated that isoneuronal axons (axons growing from the same neuron), contrarily to heteroneuronal axons, avoid each other when growing on the same substrate (see Movie). This was further explored, by other authors, the fact that this self-avoidance would require neurites to be able to distinguish between self and non-self, reinforcing the ideas of Yau. In 1983 Kramer and Kuwada propose that this self-recognition of two growing axonal processes might be mediated by their filopodia, which appear to make mutual contacts. This idea was backed up by the studies of Goodman et al. (1982) in insect neurons, which postulated that filopodia played an important role in the recognition and choice of axonal growth pathways. The conservation of the mechanism in invertebrates together with the fact that adult morphology of many neurons appears to satisfy the rule, suggested that non-overlap of isoneuronal processes could be a general phenomenon of neuronal development. In 1985 empirical data was added by Kramer and Stent with the experimentally induced variations in the branching pattern through surgically preventing or delaying the outgrowth of the axon branches. As predicted by the proposal of self-avoidance, interference with the outgrowth of a field axon branch resulted in the spread of the axon branch of the other field into what normally was not a territory. Thus, neuronal self-avoidance does play a significant role in the development of mechanosensory receptive field structure.

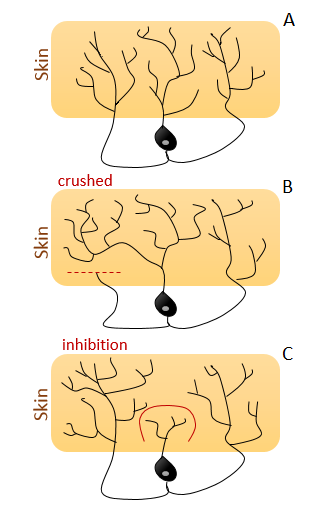
Figure 4. Subfields of leech mechanosensory axons compete for territory. Wild type leech mechanosensory neuron with three separate subfields innervating adjacent regions of the epidermis (A). If the growth cone of one branch is crushed (B) or delayed (C), the sibling subfields grow occupying the free territory.Simplified diagrams, based on results in Kramer & Stent, 1985

In the late 1980s, the molecular machinery that could be the basis of the phenomena started to be unveiled. Receptors such as cell adhesion molecules of the cadherin and immunoglobulin super families, which mediate interactions between opposing cell surfaces, and integrins acting as receptors for extracellular matrix components were widely expressed on developing neurites.

In 1990, Macagno et al., integrated the results from several studies, once again emphasizing the evolutionary conservation of the overall phenomena: Leech neurons, like those of other invertebrates and those of vertebrates, undergo specific interactions during development which allow the definition of the adult morphologies and synaptic connections. That morphology reflects the developmental compromise between the potential of the neuron to grow and the constraints placed upon that growth by internal and external factors. Thus, the self-recognizing mechanism would be useful not only to self-avoidance but also as a means of individualization. During development, competition among neurons of the same type for a limited supply required for process growth and maintenance would occur, with one cell gaining space at the expense of others. Inhibitory interactions were also invoked, and this placed the phenomena of self-recognition in the bigger picture of the axon guidance process. Together, these studies led to the view that neural circuit assembly emerged as a result of a relatively small number of different signals and their receptors, some acting in a graded fashion and in different combinations.

In 1991, scientists became aware that self-avoidance was also present in non-neuronal cell types, such as leech comb cells, which might similarly form discrete domains. Later, this was also observed in mammalian astrocytes. Wang and Macagno, in 1998, again recurring to Hirudo medicinalis mechanosensory neurons, performed an elegant experiment in order to try to answer the still remaining question: "How does a cell recognize self and respond by not growing over or along itself?" The authors then proposed two general types of mechanisms: I) External signals: Sibling neurites display surface identifying molecular factors, unique to each cell, that are capable of homotypic binding and therefore repel sibling neurites, or II) Internal signals: synchronous cell activity, such as voltage, which is transmitted within the cell mediating a dynamic mechanism of sibling growth inhibition. Contrarily to the first hypothesis, the second would require the continuity and communication between all parts of the cell for self-avoidance to occur. So the experiment consisted of detaching one of the neurons dendrites and see how the remaining attached dendrites reacted towards the detached fragment, "do they still avoid overlapping?" The result was that the detached branch would stop being recognized as "self" by the other branches of the neuronal, leading to dendrite overlap. The clear conclusion of the study was that continuity between all parts of the neuron is critical for self-avoidance to operate. The authors then suggest various mechanisms that require continuity and could function as recognition signal, and thus might be the responsible ones, such as "electrical activity, active or passive, as well as the diffusion of cytoplasmic signals either passively or by fast axonal transport". In the late 1990s and beyond, model organisms started to be used in the studies and the molecular mechanisms of self-avoidance started to be unraveled. In 1999 Wu and Maniatis discovered a striking organization of a large family of human neural protocadherin cell adhesion genes which formed a gene cluster encoding 58 protocadherins. The members of the protocadherin gene cluster were compelling candidates to provide the molecular code required for the maintenance of the self/non-self discrimination that led to self-avoidance. It was later (2012) confirmed, by Lefebvre et al., in a study with amacrine cells and Purkinje cells of Mus musculus, that these proteins are expressed in different combinations in individual neurons, thus providing "barcodes" with that distinguish one neuron from another.

In 2000, Schmucker et al., through cDNA and genomic analyses of Drosophila dendritic arborization sensory neurons, the existence of multiple forms of Down syndrome cell adhesion molecule (Dscam) was revealed. The authors saw that alternative splicing could potentially generate more than 38,000 Dscam isoforms and hypothesized that this molecular diversity could contribute to the specificity of neuronal connectivity and thus, self-avoidance.

Together, the discoveries of the two large families of cell surface proteins encoded by the Dscam1 locus and the clustered protocadherin (Pcdh) loci opened the door to the numerous modern studies. The current studies take great advantage not only of the uprising of the molecular and genomic biology but also from the bioinformatics tools, developed since the 19th century.

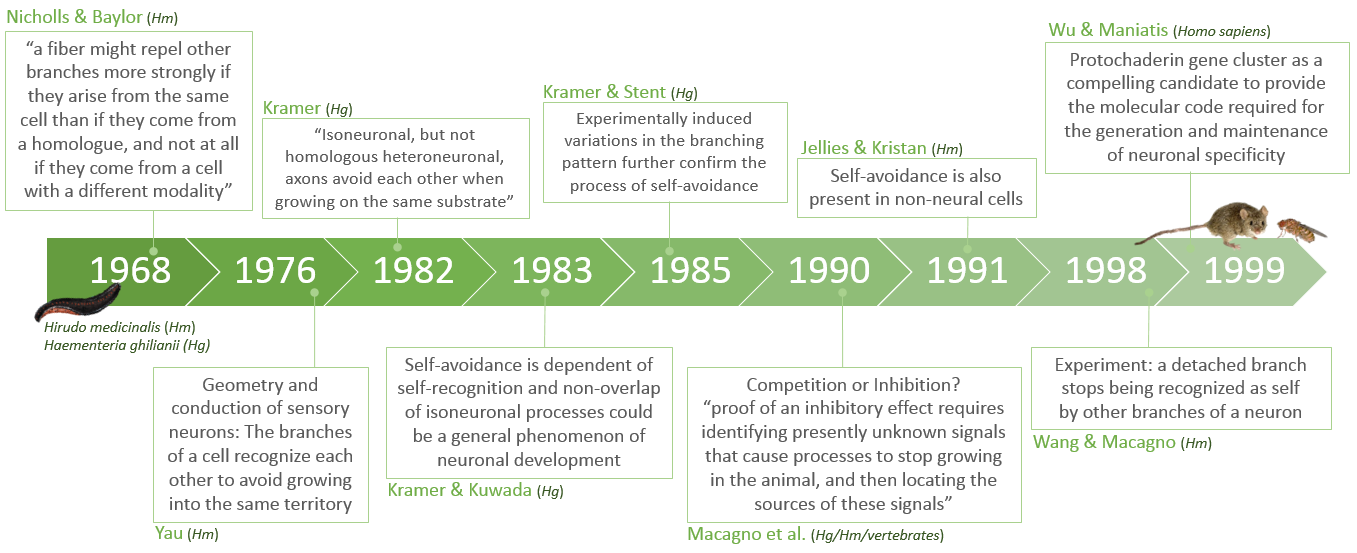
Figure 6. Timeline regarding important discoveries about neuronal self-avoidance. Authors and organisms utilized in the studies are presented.

== Models, structures and development of self-avoidance ==
=== Animal models ===
Self-avoidance has been widely discussed amongst scientists and throughout time the experiments were done in several animal models. The first experiments were done in leech. In 1981, Wässle tried to understand how retinal ganglion cells establish their dendritic territories in cats. Processes like dendritic tiling and self-avoidance are extremely important to correct development of neuronal structures, and in this specific case ganglion cells have to cover the retina to guarantee that every point of the visual space is actually "seen". He saw that cell bodies are arrayed in regular mosaic, and dendritic fields adapt to the available space. However, this hypothesis was based in mathematical models: Dirichlet model.

Perry and Linden (1982) were the first to present clear evidence of the dendritic "competition" in mice retina. Destruction of ganglion cells gives the chance to their neighboring cells to extend their dendritic projections. They proposed competition for synapses as the cause for equilibrium between growth and repulsion of dendrites.

Though mouse and Drosophila are the models currently used to construct a model of self-avoidance for vertebrates and invertebrates respectively, throughout time there are several examples of this phenomenon in other model and non-model species:

- Frog (Xenopus laevis)

Trigeminal neurons in head skin exhibit a competitive behavior and only when one of them is completely removed, for example the left trigeminal ganglion, allows the right ganglion neurites to cross midline and innervate left side of the head. The correct innervation is due to repulsive nature of interactions between these movement detector neurites reinforcing all the anterior models of self-avoidance.

- Goldfish (Carassius spp.)

Retina grows throughout life by addition of new neurons at the margin and death of ganglion neurons in the center. Once again it is proved that each cell senses neighbor cells and can occupy space left by other.

- Zebra fish (Danio rerio)

Trigeminal neurons, developed 16hrs post fertilization, are part of the peripheral sensory system and detect thermal and mechanical stimuli in the skin. The "growth-and-repulsion" model arose from complex topographic restriction of growth cones between trigeminal and Rohon-Beard neurons.

- Planaria (Dugesia japonica)

Dscam mutants exhibit severely disorganized neural network and axon fasciculation.

== Principal structures for self-avoidance studies ==
The two major structures used in self-avoidance studies are the retinal ganglion cells (RGC) in mice and somatosensory neurons in Drosophila. These structures are pointed as different molecular models because the principal molecule involved in self-avoidance is Dscam in invertebrates and Protocadherins in vertebrates.

=== Mouse retina ===
Correct assembly of the components in mice retina is dependent of Dscam/DscamL1 correct expression to form mosaics of different cell type of RGC, soma spacing and dendrite arborization, thus ensuring the coverage of all visual area by each cell type and more specifically to inhibit excessive fasciculation and clumping of cell bodies in photoreceptors, rod bipolar cells (RBCs) and amacrine cells in visual system. The occurrence of correct stratification and connection with synapses tells us that Dscam knockout affects only the repulsive interactions and coverage of the dendritic arbors and functional bindings are maintained.

The actual main conclusions are based in the identification of different types of retinal neurons, each one with a different coverage factor value revealing graded degrees of homotypic dendritic repulsion. Developmental sequence accepted is 1) define number and spacing of cells, 2) controlled growth of branches and 3) fine-tune of dendritic tiling for maximal coverage of the structure. Experiments with mutant mice for Math5 and Brn3b (responsible of degeneration of 95% and 80% of retinal ganglion cells, respectively) shows that removal of ganglion cells doesn't decrease the retinal ganglion cell types and that position of these cells is not defined by dendritic homotypic interactions only, but for some kind of intrinsic genetic program.

=== Dendritic arborization neurons ===
Drosophila melanogaster is the model for experiments in multiple dendritic (MD) neurons which compose the stereotyped pattern of peripheral nervous system. Dendritic arborization neurons are the major subtype of MD neurons group and presents highly branched dendrites underneath the epidermis. Sugimura et al. showed dendritic arborization (da) neurons that stabilize their branches shape in early larval stages and others that continue shaping throughout life cycle.

As other types of cells involved in processes dependent of self-recognition (like self-avoidance and tiling, See Figure-2) these da neurons can fill the empty spaces left by neighbor cells and this filling-in process is triggered by loss of local isoneural inhibitory contacts.

=== Larval eye ===
Since Drosophila is one of the best studied models in mechanisms of neuronal self-recognition, we can find several results obtained in larval stages. One of the most remarkable examples is the incorrect development of dendritic arbors in the larval eye (Bolwig's organ) due to Dscam knockout mutation.

== Development ==
Numerous models and structures with different development timing and life cycles are used in studies of self-avoidance. Therefore, some conflicts arise when we try to define a strict development phase for the occurrence of these phenomena. The initial idea was that, in some early development point, neural cells contact with each other and organize their distribution, but several studies demonstrated that self-avoidance is also present in adult life.

To solve this question it would be ideal to monitor dendritic development of neurons from its birth till maturation inside whole-mount animals.

In Drosophila, studies comprise both larval and adult phases, and number of hours after egg layer is determinant for correct construction of dendritic tiling in sensory neurons. Early in the pupal stage, those neurons prune all their dendrites. Later each neuron grows a completely new dendrite for adult function. While the dendrites are being remodeled, the axons stay largely intact and all these phases will be negatively impacted in case of interference with self-avoidance propriety.

Exons of Dscam domains can be differently expressed according to the life cycle phase of the fly. Exon 9 splicing is temporally regulated, with only a few exon 9 sequences contributing to early embryo isoforms and the remaining exon 9 possible sequences become more prevalent with age. These results prove that, independently of the thousands of isoforms that could be generated, the diversity continues to be temporally and spatially controlled.

In mouse retina the majority of ganglion cells are born at E17 (embryonic stage/day 17). At this age the retina has reached 25% of its mature size

== Molecular basis of self-avoidance ==
Cellular studies of self-avoidance imply that any underlying molecular mechanism must enforce robust and selective contact-dependent cell surface recognition only between sister branches, and must link recognition to changes in growth cone behavior. Recent studies to define the molecular basis of contact-dependent homotypic interactions led to the identification of two large families of cell-surface proteins encoded by the Drosophila Down syndrome cell adhesion molecule 1 (Dscam1) locus and the clustered protocadherin (Pcdh) loci in mammals. These proteins, with diverse extracellular domains, and shared cytoplasmatic presumptive intracellular signaling domains, are able to provide diverse recognition specificities to a vast array of different neurites, endowing neurons with a unique cell-surface identity that allows neurons to distinguish self from non-self. Additional self-surface receptors implicated in self-avoidance include the immunoglobulin superfamily member Turtle, which functions in some Drosophila da neurons to enforce terminal branch spacing.

== Invertebrates ==
=== DSCAM1 ===
Several studies have implicated Drosophila Dscam1 in dendritic and axonal self-avoidance and process spacing in diverse neuronal populations, including mushroom body axons, olfactory projection neuron (PN) dendrites, and dendritic arborization (da) neuron dendrites It is notable that the function of Dscam in invertebrates is both context and species-dependent, as the molecule has been shown to regulate repulsion, outgrowth, attraction/ adhesion, and synapse formation in different systems.

Dscam1 encodes an immunoglobulin (Ig) superfamily member which, in Drosophila, can generate up to 19,008 proteins with distinct ectodomains. In binding assays, Dscams show isoform-specific homophilic interactions, but little interaction occurs between different, yet closely related, isoforms.

== Dscam1 controls self-avoidance ==
Dscam1 mediated self-recognition is essential for self-avoidance between sister neurites Hughes et al. (2007) reported that Dscam loss-of-function in da neurons caused excessive self-crossing of dendrites from the same neuron. Dscam over-expression forced the respective dendrites to segregate from each other. Based on these data, Dscam results in a lack of self-avoidance of sister dendrites. Therefore, the direct isoform-specific homophilic Dscam-Dscam interactions must result in signal transduction events that lead to repulsion of dendrites expressing identical Dscam isoforms. This conversion of an initial Dscam-dependent cell-surface interaction into a repulsive response that leads to dendrite separation in da neurons is supported by Matthews et al. (2007) in a study that demonstrated that the ectopic expression of identical Dscam isoforms on the dendrites of different cells promoted growth away from each other. The authors also suggest that identical Dscam isoforms expressed in two cell populations in vitro induced their aggregation in an isoform-specific manner, showing that Dscam provides cells with the ability to distinguish between different cell surfaces. Moreover, expression of single Dscam1 molecules lacking most of their cytoplasmic tail prevented ectopic branch segregation and instead led to apparently stable adhesion between dendrites. Combined, these results support a simple model for a direct role for Dscam in self-recognition in which identical Dscam ectodomains on the surfaces of isoneuronal dendrites recognize each other and induce a subsequent repulsive signal that is mediated by domains in the cytoplasmic tail (Figure 7).

Homophilic recognition provides the molecular basis for self-avoidance

To test whether homophilic binding of Dscam1 isoforms is required for self-avoidance, Wu and coworkers generated pairs of chimeric isoforms that bind to each other (heterophilic) but not to themselves (homophilic). These isoforms failed to support self-avoidance. By contrast, co-expression of complementary isoforms within the same neuron restored self-avoidance. These data establish that recognition between Dscam1 isoforms on opposing surfaces of neurites of the same cell provides the molecular basis for self-avoidance.

=== Diversity at the Dscam1 locus is essential for self-recognition ===
Diversity of Dscam isoforms in individual neurons is not required for self-avoidance ...

In 2004, Zhan et al. published a study in which the function of Dscam diversity was explored by assessing the isoforms of Dscam expressed by the developing mushroom body (MB) neurons, as well as the ability of individual isoforms to rescue the Dscam loss-of-function phenotypes and the consequences of ectopic expression of single Dscam isoforms. They demonstrated that different subtypes of MB neurons express different arrays of Dscam isoforms and that loss of Dscam1 in these neurons leads to a failure in branch separation, a phenotype that can be rescued by the expression of single arbitrary isoforms in single neurons. Also, in da neurons, single arbitrarily chosen isoforms rescued the Dscam1 null self-avoidance phenotype. These results lead to the conclusion that Dscam1 diversity is not required in individual neurons for self-avoidance.

... but diversity of Dscam isoforms expressed by neurons of different types is essential for discriminating between self and non-self neurites

To test whether sister branch segregation requires neighboring mushroom body axons to express different sets of Dscam isoforms, Hattori et al. (2009) reduced the entire repertoire of Dscam ectodomains to just a single isoform using homologous recombination and examined mushroom body morphology in Dscam^{single} and control animals. In the majority of the mushroom bodies analyzed, one of the two lobes was completely absent and in the few remaining samples, one lobe was significantly thinner than the other. This dominant phenotype indicates that the defects do not result from the loss of any one isoform, but rather the presence of the same isoform on all axons. These studies led to the conclusion that each neuron expresses a set of Dscam1 isoforms largely different from their neighbors and that it is crucial for neighboring neurons to express distinct Dscam isoforms, but the specific identity of the isoforms expressed in an individual neuron is unimportant, as long as sister branches express the identical set of isoforms to allow for the homotypic repulsion between them.

Thousands of isoforms are required for proper self-recognition

Later on, Hattori et al. (2009) took a genomic replacement strategy to generate mutant animals in which the number of potential Dscam1 isoforms was limited. Their goal was to determine how many isoforms were necessary to ensure that neurites do not inappropriately recognize and avoid non-self-neurites. Branching patterns improved as the potential number of isoforms increased, independently of the identity of the isoforms. In conclusion, the size of isoform pool required for robust discrimination between self and non-self is in the thousands.

In sum, isoform identity between branches of the same neuron leads to recognition via the extracellular region and repulsion mediated by the intracellular tail of Dscam1. As the Dscam1 isoforms expressed in different da neurons are likely to be different, dendrites of different da neurons do not inappropriately recognize non-self as self. Thus, Dscam1 proteins are required for self-avoidance and provide the molecular code by which neurites discriminate between self-dendrites and those of neighboring cells (Figure 7).

== Vertebrates ==
=== DSCAM and DSCAML1 ===
Self-avoidance has only recently been explored in the vertebrate brain development and mainly in the context of patterning neurites in the Inner plexiform layers (IPLs). In contrast to Drosophila, mouse DSCAMs are typical cell surface molecules, lacking the massive alternative splicing of the fly Dscam1 orthologous undergoes. So although DSCAMs may retain a conserved function in mediating self-avoidance in vertebrates, the absence of molecular diversity makes it clear that they do not play a role in self-recognition.

Dscams act to negate cell-type-specific interactions rather than actively promoting repulsion in vertebrates' neurites

Considering that Dscam and Dscaml1 have non-overlapping expression patterns in the mouse retina, with Dscam being expressed in a subset of amacrine cells and most retinal ganglion cells (RGC) and Dscaml1 expressed in the rod circuit, Fuerst et al. (2009) examined retinal ganglion cell populations in Dscam^{−/−} mice and, in addition, assessed retinal anatomy in the rod circuit using a gene-trap-knockout allele of Dscaml1. In the absence of either gene, the cells that would normally express it showed excessive fasciculation of their dendrites and clumping of their cell bodies. These findings led to the conclusion that Dscam and Dscaml1 prevent excessive adhesion, primarily by masking cell-type-specific adhesive interactions between dendrites of the same cell class, rather than actively promoting repulsion between them. Thus, in the absence of diversity, mammalian DSCAMs do not provide cells with the ability to distinguish between their own processes and the processes of all other cells, including processes from cells of the same type. Instead, DSCAM acts to negate cell-type-specific interactions that are promoted by other recognition molecules.

=== Protocadherin ===
More recent studies demonstrated that mice use a different family of cell recognition molecules: clustered Protocadherins (Pcdhs), in a fly Dscam1-like strategy to regulate self-avoidance. Although both clustered Pcdhs and Dscam1 genes generate families of proteins with diverse ectodomains joined to a common cytoplasmic domain, the mode of generating clustered Pcdhs and fly Dscam1 counterpart diversity is markedly different. Pcdhs diversity is largely generated by alternative promoter choice, as opposed to alternative splicing. The number of Pcdhs isoforms varies between different vertebrate species, but in aggregate, there are typically on the order of 50 isoforms.

Isoform-specific homophilic recognition

Compelling evidence for discrete binding specificities of different clustered Pcdhs isoforms was uncovered in 2010 by Schreiner & Weiner, who verified that Pcdhs promote isoform-specific homophilic recognition. While the number of Pcdhs isoforms pales in comparison to the number of Dscam1 isoforms, hetero-oligomerization of Pcdhs markedly increases the number of discrete binding specificities encoded by the locus. Pcdhs are required for self-avoidance

To seek roles of Pcdh-γs in self-avoidance, Lefebvre et al. (2012) focused on a retinal interneuron, the starburst amacrine cell (SAC), which expresses Pcdh-γs and exhibits dramatic dendritic self-avoidance. They used a Cre-Lox system to delete all the variable domains of the Pcdh-γ locus in the developing retina and verified that dendrites arising from a single SAC frequently crossed each other and sometimes formed loose bundles, similarly to the removal of Dscam1 from da neurons (Figure 8).

Pcdhs diversity is essential for self-recognition

Furthermore, Lefebvre and colleagues assessed the requirement for isoform diversity in Pcdh-γ-dependent self-avoidance. They demonstrated that single arbitrarily chosen isoforms rescued self-avoidance defects of Pcdh-γ mutant and that expression of the same isoform in neighboring SACs reduced the overlap between them. Their results indicate that diversity appears to underlie self/non-self discrimination, presumably because neighboring neurons are unlikely to express the same isoforms and are therefore free to interact. Therefore, isoform diversity enables SACs to distinguish isoneuronal from heteroneuronal dendrites. As with Dscam1, self-avoidance in SACs does not rely on a specific isoform, but rather requires that isoform usage differs among neighboring cells. Thus, two phyla appear to have recruited different molecules to mediate similar, complex strategies for self-recognition, thereby promoting self-avoidance.

== See also ==
- Neural development
- Neurogenesis
- Neuronal tiling
- Axon guidance
- Role of cell adhesions in neural development
- Dendrite
- Synaptogenesis
- Pioneer neuron
