= Neuronal tiling =

Arrangement of neurons

Neuronal tiling is a phenomenon in which multiple arbors of neurons innervate the same surface or tissue in a nonredundant and tiled pattern that maximizes coverage of the surface while minimizing overlap between neighboring arbors. Hence, dendrites of the same neuron spread out by avoiding one another (self-avoidance). Moreover, dendrites of certain types of neurons such as class III and class IV dendritic arborization neurons avoid dendrites of neighboring neurons of the same type (tiling), whereas dendrites of different neuronal types can cover the same territory (coexistence).

One good example of this organization is the cell bodies of virtually all retinal cell types which are arranged as independent, nonrandom mosaics that maximize the distance between neighbouring cells.

Elucidating the mechanisms of process spacing during development is therefore relevant for understanding principles of tissue organization inside and outside of the nervous system.
