= Cell adhesion =

Process of cell attachment

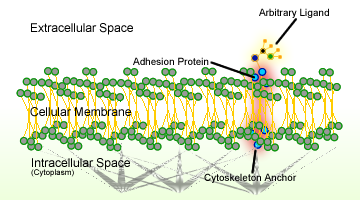
Schematic of cell adhesion

Cell adhesion is the process by which cells interact and attach to neighbouring cells through specialised molecules of the cell surface. This process can occur either through direct contact between cell surfaces such as cell junctions or indirect interaction, where cells attach to surrounding extracellular matrix (ECM), a gel-like structure containing molecules released by cells into spaces between them. Cell adhesion occurs from the interactions between cell adhesion molecules (CAMs), transmembrane proteins located in the cell membrane. Cell adhesion links cells in different ways and can be involved in signal transduction for cells to detect and respond to changes in the surroundings. Other cellular processes regulated by cell adhesion include cell migration and tissue development in multicellular organisms. Alterations in cell adhesion can disrupt important cellular processes and lead to a variety of diseases, including cancer and arthritis. Cell adhesion is also essential for infectious organisms, such as bacteria or viruses, to cause disease.

== General mechanism ==
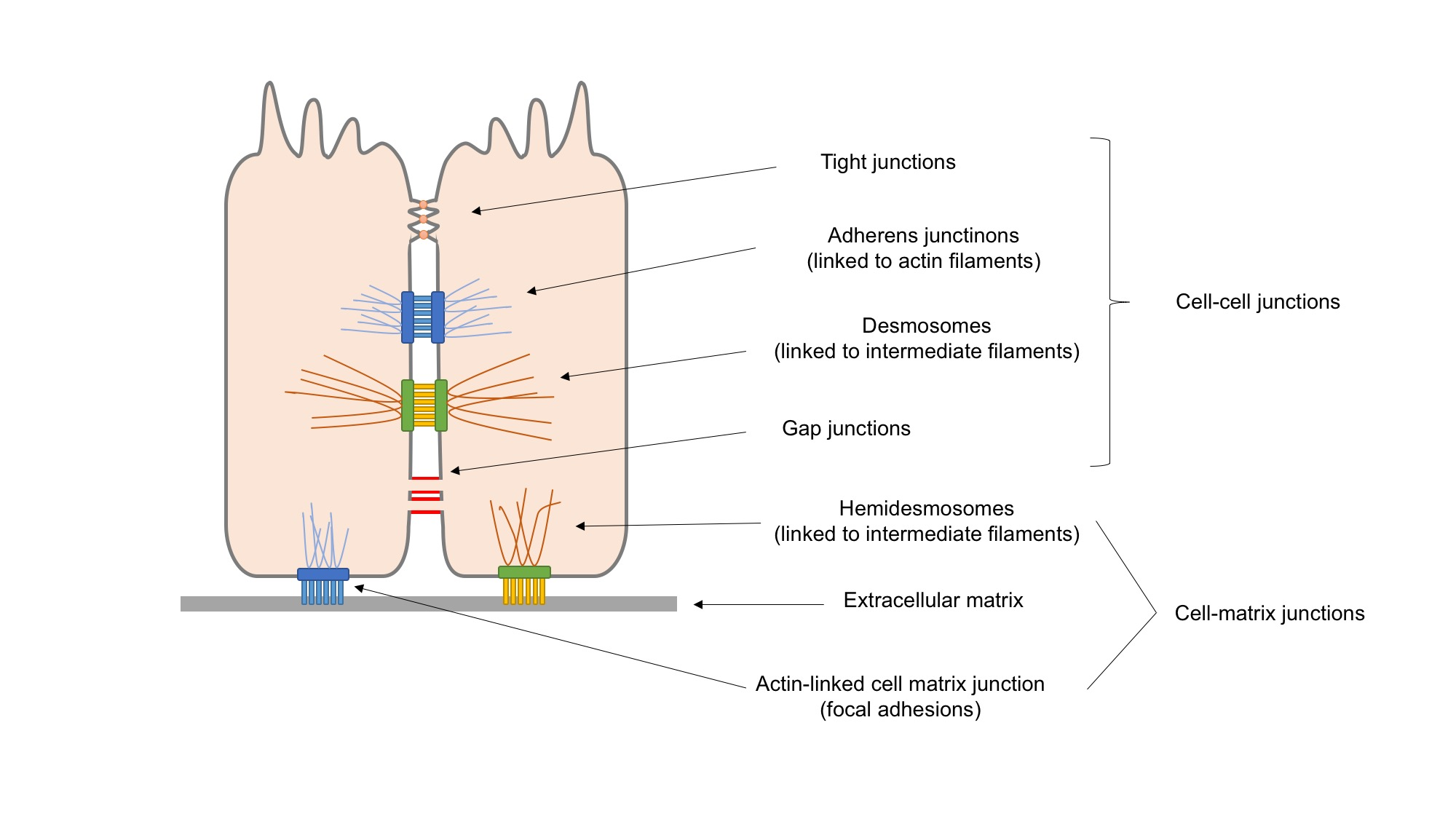
Overview diagram of different types of cell junctions present in epithelial cells, including cell–cell junctions and cell–matrix junctions.

Cell adhesion molecules (CAMs) are classified into four major families: integrins, immunoglobulin superfamily, cadherins, and selectins. Cadherins and IgSF are homophilic CAMs, as they directly bind to the same type of CAMs on another cell, while integrins and selectins are heterophilic CAMs that bind to different types of CAMs. Each of these adhesion molecules has a different function and recognizes different ligands. Defects in cell adhesion are usually attributable to defects in expression of CAMs.

In multicellular organisms, bindings between CAMs allow cells to adhere to one another and creates structures called cell junctions. According to their functions, the cell junctions can be classified as:

- Anchoring junctions (adherens junctions, desmosomes and hemidesmosomes), which maintain cells together and strengthens contact between cells.
- Occluding junctions (tight junctions), which seal gaps between cells through cell–cell contact, making an impermeable barrier for diffusion
- Channel-forming junctions (gap junctions), which links cytoplasm of adjacent cells allowing transport of molecules to occur between cells
- Signal-relaying junctions, which can be synapses in the nervous system

Alternatively, cell junctions can be categorised into two main types according to what interacts with the cell: cell–cell junctions, mainly mediated by cadherins, and cell–matrix junctions, mainly mediated by integrins.

=== Cell–cell junctions ===
Cell–cell junctions can occur in different forms. In anchoring junctions between cells such as adherens junctions and desmosomes, the main CAMs present are the cadherins. This family of CAMs are membrane proteins that mediate cell–cell adhesion through its extracellular domains and require extracellular Ca^{2+} ions to function correctly. Cadherins forms homophilic attachment between themselves, which results in cells of a similar type sticking together and can lead to selective cell adhesion, allowing vertebrate cells to assemble into organised tissues. Cadherins are essential for cell–cell adhesion and cell signaling in multicellular animals and can be separated into two types: classical cadherins and non-classical cadherins.

==== Adherens junctions ====
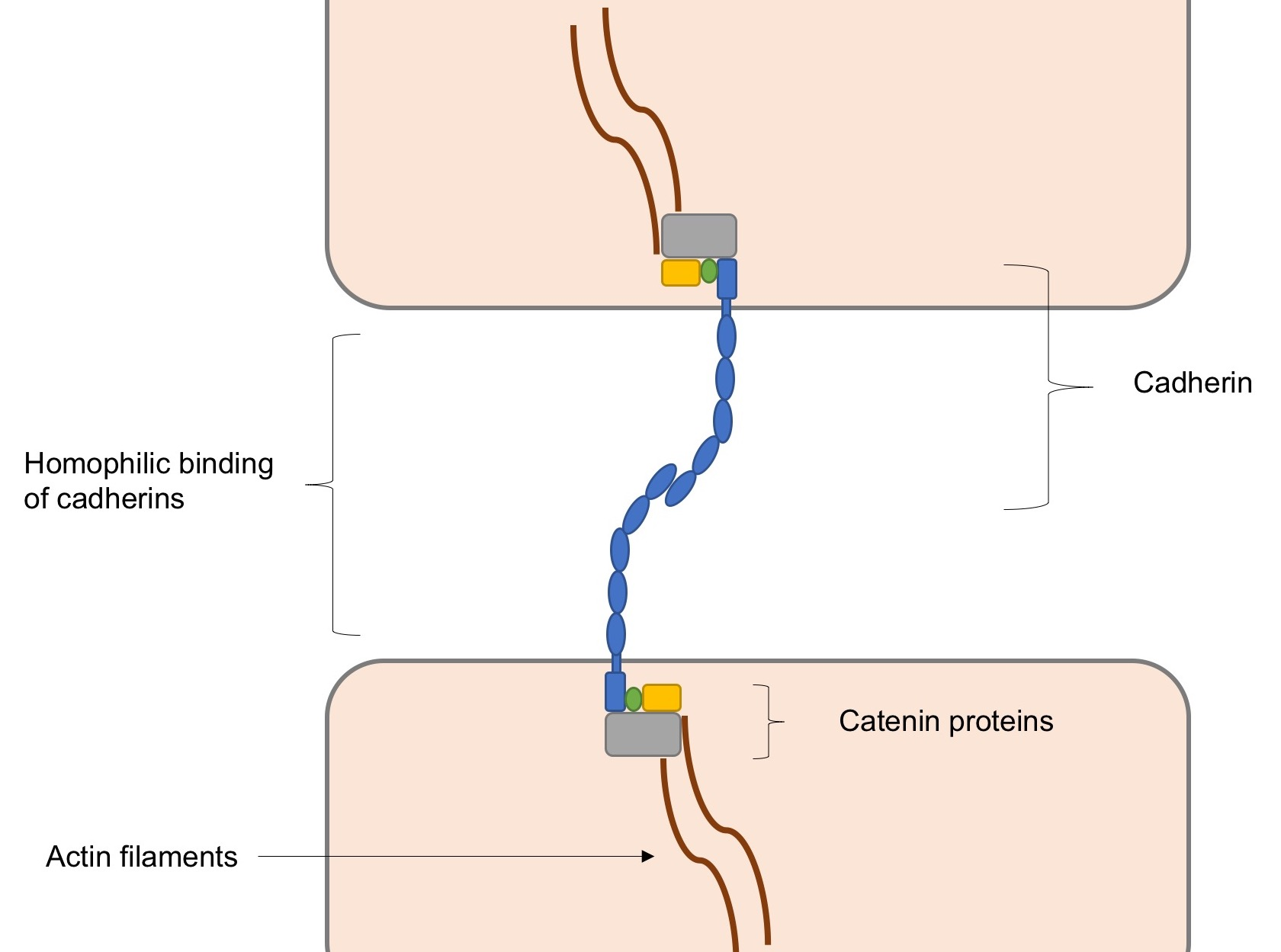
Adheren junction showing homophilic binding between cadherins and how catenin links it to actin filaments

Adherens junctions mainly function to maintain shape of tissues and hold cells together. In adherens junctions, classical cadherins between neighbouring cells interact through their extracellular domains. Classical cadherins share a conserved calcium-sensitive region in their extracellular domains. When this region comes into contact with Ca^{2+} ions, extracellular domains of cadherins change from the inactive flexible conformation to a more rigid conformation to undergo homophilic binding. Intracellular domains of classical cadherins are also highly conserved as they bind to proteins called catenins forming catenin-cadherin complexes, which links classical cadherins to actin filaments. This association with actin filaments is essential for adherens junctions to stabilises cell–cell adhesion. Interactions with actin filaments can also promote clustering of cadherins, involved in assembly of adherens junctions, as cadherin clusters promotes actin filaments polymerisation which in turn assembles adherens junctions by binding to cadherin–catenin complexes forming at the junction.

==== Desmosomes ====
Desmosomes are structurally similar to adherens junctions but composed of different components. Instead of classical cadherins, non-classical cadherins such as desmogleins and desmocollins act as adhesion molecules and they are linked to intermediate filaments instead of actin filaments. No catenin is present in desmosomes, as intracellular domains of desmosomal cadherins interact with desmosomal plaque proteins, which form the thick cytoplasmic plaques in desmosomes and link cadherins to intermediate filaments. Desmosomes provides strength and resistance to mechanical stress by unloading forces onto the flexible but resilient intermediate filaments, something that cannot occur with the rigid actin filaments. This makes desmosomes important in tissues that encounter high levels of mechanical stress, such as heart muscle and epithelial tissue, and explains why it appears frequently in these types of tissues.

==== Tight junctions ====
Tight junctions are normally present in epithelial and endothelial tissues, where they seal gaps and regulate paracellular transport of solutes and extracellular fluids in these tissues that function as barriers. Tight junction is formed by transmembrane proteins, including claudins, occludins and tricellulins, that bind closely to each other on adjacent membranes in a homophilic manner. Similar to anchoring junctions, intracellular domains of these tight junction proteins are bound with scaffold proteins that keep these proteins in clusters and link them to actin filaments in order to maintain structure of the tight junction. Claudins, essential for formation of tight junctions, form paracellular pores which allow selective passage of specific ions across tight junctions making the barrier selectively permeable.

==== Gap junctions ====
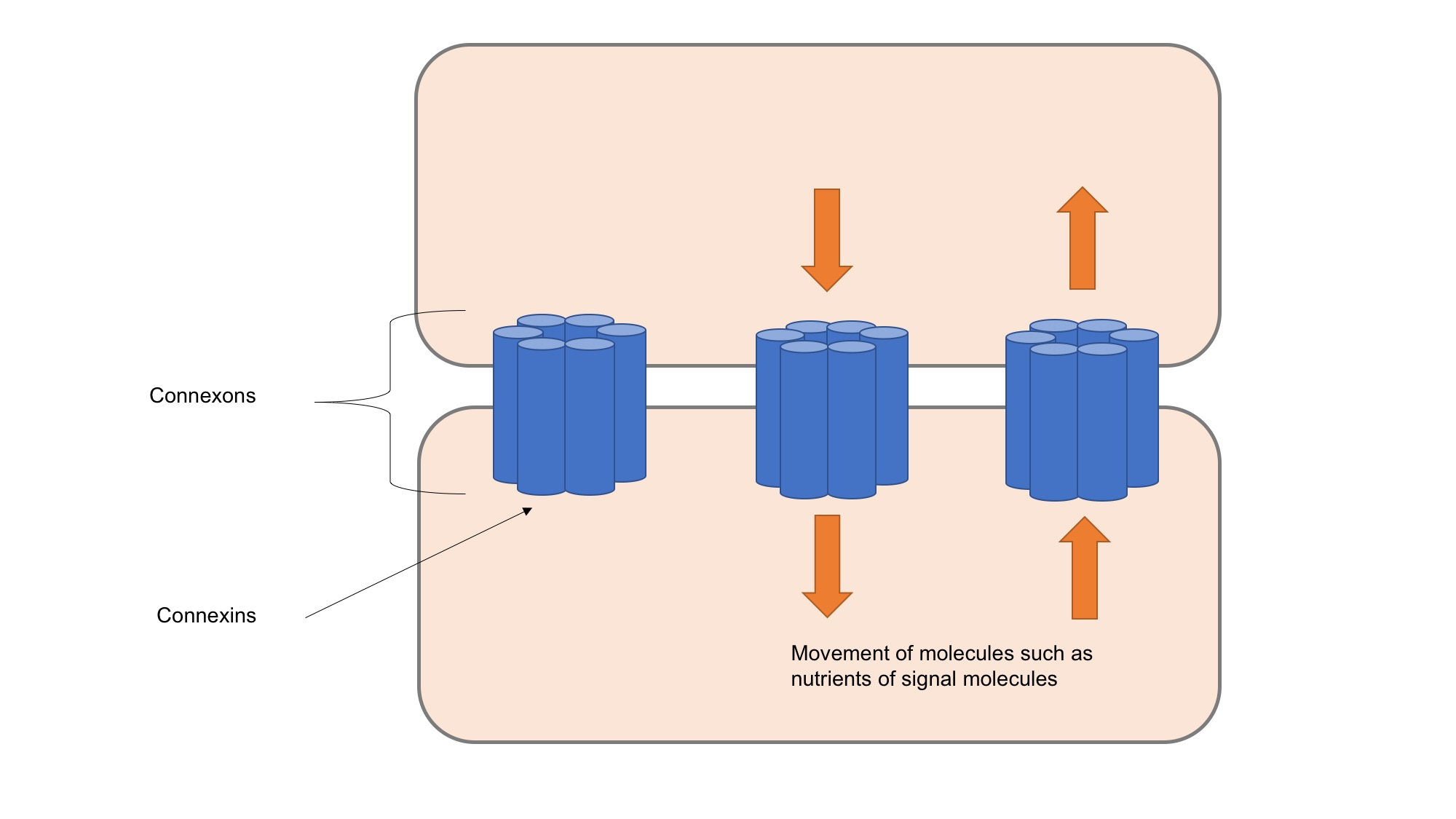
Gap junctions showing connexons and connexins

Gap junctions are composed of channels called connexons, which consist of transmembrane proteins called connexins clustered in groups of six. Connexons from adjacent cells form continuous channels when they come into contact and align with each other. These channels allow transport of ions and small molecules between cytoplasm of two adjacent cells, apart from holding cells together and provide structural stability like anchoring junctions or tight junctions. Gap junction channels are selectively permeable to specific ions depending on which connexins form the connexons, which allows gap junctions to be involved in cell signalling by regulating the transfer of molecules involved in signalling cascades. Channels can respond to many different stimuli and are regulated dynamically either by rapid mechanisms, such as voltage gating, or by slow mechanism, such as altering numbers of channels present in gap junctions.

==== Selectins ====
Selectins are a family of specialised CAMs involved in transient cell–cell adhesion occurring in the circulatory system. They mainly mediate the movement of white blood cells (leukocytes) in the bloodstream by allowing the white blood cells to "roll" on endothelial cells through reversible bindings of selections. Selectins undergo heterophilic bindings, as its extracellular domain binds to carbohydrates on adjacent cells instead of other selectins, while it also require Ca^{2+} ions to function, same as cadherins. Cell–cell adhesion of leukocytes to endothelial cells is important for immune responses as leukocytes can travel to sites of infection or injury through this mechanism. At these sites, integrins on the rolling white blood cells are activated and bind firmly to the local endothelial cells, allowing the leukocytes to stop migrating and move across the endothelial barrier.

==== Immunoglobulin superfamily ====
The immunoglobulin superfamily (IgSF) is one of the largest superfamily of proteins in the body and it contains many diverse CAMs involved in different functions. These transmembrane proteins have one or more immunoglobulin-like domains in their extracellular domains and undergo calcium-independent binding with ligands on adjacent cells. Some IgSF CAMs, such as neural cell adhesion molecules (NCAMs), can perform homophilic binding while others, such as intercellular cell adhesion molecules (ICAMs) or vascular cell adhesion molecules (VCAMs) undergo heterophilic binding with molecules like carbohydrates or integrins. Both ICAMs and VCAMs are expressed on vascular endothelial cells and they interact with integrins on the leukocytes to assist leukocyte attachment and its movement across the endothelial barrier.

=== Cell–matrix junctions ===
Cells create extracellular matrix by releasing molecules into its surrounding extracellular space. Cells have specific CAMs that will bind to molecules in the extracellular matrix and link the matrix to the intracellular cytoskeleton. Extracellular matrix can act as a support when organising cells into tissues and can also be involved in cell signalling by activating intracellular pathways when bound to the CAMs. Cell–matrix junctions are mainly mediated by integrins, which also clusters like cadherins to form firm adhesions. Integrins are transmembrane heterodimers formed by different α and β subunits, both subunits with different domain structures. Integrins can signal in both directions: inside-out signalling, intracellular signals modifying the intracellular domains, can regulate affinity of integrins for their ligands, while outside-in signalling, extracellular ligands binding to extracellular domains, can induce conformational changes in integrins and initiate signalling cascades. Extracellular domains of integrins can bind to different ligands through heterophilic binding while intracellular domains can either be linked to intermediate filaments, forming hemidesmosomes, or to actin filaments, forming focal adhesions.

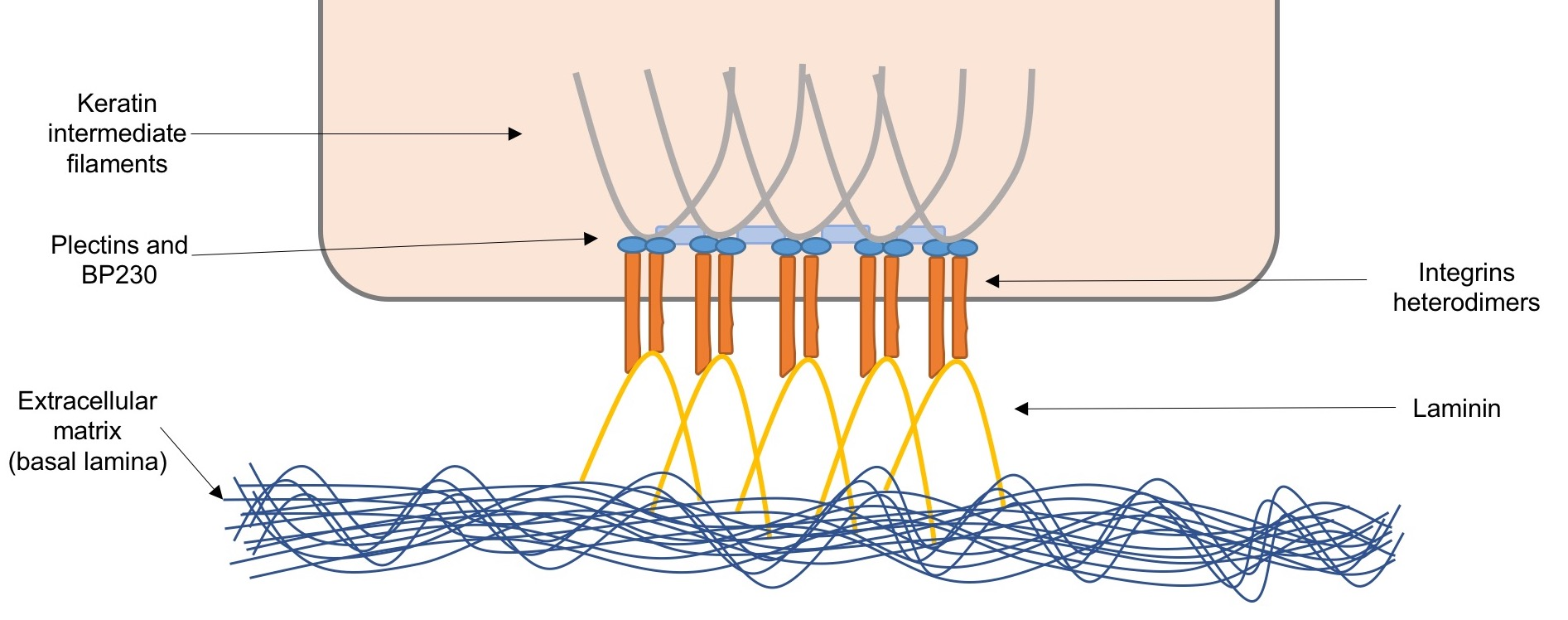
Hemidesmosomes diagram showing interaction between integrins and laminin, including how integrins are linked to keratin intermediate filaments

==== Hemidesmosomes ====
In hemidesmosomes, integrins attach to extracellular matrix proteins called laminins in the basal lamina, which is the extracellular matrix secreted by epithelial cells. Integrins link extracellular matrix to keratin intermediate filaments, which interacts with intracellular domain of integrins via adapter proteins such as plectins and BP230. Hemidesmosomes are important in maintaining structural stability of epithelial cells by anchoring them together indirectly through the extracellular matrix.

==== Focal adhesions ====
In focal adhesions, integrins attach fibronectins, a component in the extracellular matrix, to actin filaments inside cells. Adapter proteins, such as talins, vinculins, α-actinins and filamins, form a complex at the intracellular domain of integrins and bind to actin filaments. This multi-protein complex linking integrins to actin filaments is important for assembly of signalling complexes that act as signals for cell growth and cell motility.

== Other organisms ==
=== Eukaryotes ===
Plant cells adhere closely to each other and are connected through plasmodesmata, channels that cross the plant cell walls and connect cytoplasms of adjacent plant cells. Molecules that are either nutrients or signals required for growth are transported, either passively or selectively, between plant cells through plasmodesmata.

Protozoans express multiple adhesion molecules with different specificities that bind to carbohydrates located on surfaces of their host cells. Cell–cell adhesion is key for pathogenic protozoans to attach en enter their host cells. An example of a pathogenic protozoan is the malarial parasite (Plasmodium falciparum), which uses one adhesion molecule called the circumsporozoite protein to bind to liver cells, and another adhesion molecule called the merozoite surface protein to bind red blood cells.

Pathogenic fungi use adhesion molecules present on its cell wall to attach, either through protein-protein or protein-carbohydrate interactions, to host cells or fibronectins in the extracellular matrix.

=== Prokaryotes ===
Prokaryotes have adhesion molecules on their cell surface termed bacterial adhesins, apart from using its pili (fimbriae) and flagella for cell adhesion. Prokaryotes may have a single or several flagella, either located on one or several places on the cell surface. Pathogenic species such as Escherichia coli and Vibrio cholera possess flagella to facilitate adhesion.

Adhesins can recognise a variety of ligands present on the host cell surfaces and also components in the extracellular matrix. These molecules also control host specificity and regulate tropism (tissue- or cell-specific interactions) through their interaction with their ligands.

=== Viruses ===
Viruses also have adhesion molecules required for viral binding to host cells. For example, influenza virus has a hemagglutinin on its surface that is required for recognition of the sugar sialic acid on host cell surface molecules. HIV has an adhesion molecule termed gp120 that binds to its ligand CD4, which is expressed on lymphocytes. Viruses can also target components of cell junctions to enter host cells, which is what happens when the hepatitis C virus targets occludins and claudins in tight junctions to enter liver cells.

== Clinical significance ==
Dysfunction of cell adhesion occurs during cancer metastasis. Loss of cell–cell adhesion in metastatic tumour cells allows them to escape their site of origin and spread through the circulatory system. One example of CAMs deregulated in cancer are cadherins, which are inactivated either by genetic mutations or by other oncogenic signalling molecules, allowing cancer cells to migrate and be more invasive. Other CAMs, like selectins and integrins, can facilitate metastasis by mediating cell–cell interactions between migrating metastatic tumour cells in the circulatory system with endothelial cells of other distant tissues. Due to the link between CAMs and cancer metastasis, these molecules could be potential therapeutic targets for cancer treatment.

There are also other human genetic diseases caused by an inability to express specific adhesion molecules. An example is leukocyte adhesion deficiency-I (LAD-I), where expression of the β_{2} integrin subunit is reduced or lost. This leads to reduced expression of β_{2} integrin heterodimers, which are required for leukocytes to firmly attach to the endothelial wall at sites of inflammation in order to fight infections. Leukocytes from LAD-I patients are unable to adhere to endothelial cells and patients exhibit serious episodes of infection that can be life-threatening.

An autoimmune disease called pemphigus is also caused by loss of cell adhesion, as it results from autoantibodies targeting a person's own desmosomal cadherins which leads to epidermal cells detaching from each other and causes skin blistering.

Pathogenic microorganisms, including bacteria, viruses and protozoans, have to first adhere to host cells in order to infect and cause diseases. Anti-adhesion therapy can be used to prevent infection by targeting adhesion molecules either on the pathogen or on the host cell. Apart from altering the production of adhesion molecules, competitive inhibitors that bind to adhesion molecules to prevent binding between cells can also be used, acting as anti-adhesive agents.

== See also ==
- Differential adhesion hypothesis
- Role of cell adhesions in neural development
