= Congenital clasped thumb =

- Other names: infant’s persistent thumb-clutched hand, flexion-adduction deformity of the thumb, pollex varus, thumb in the hand deformity.
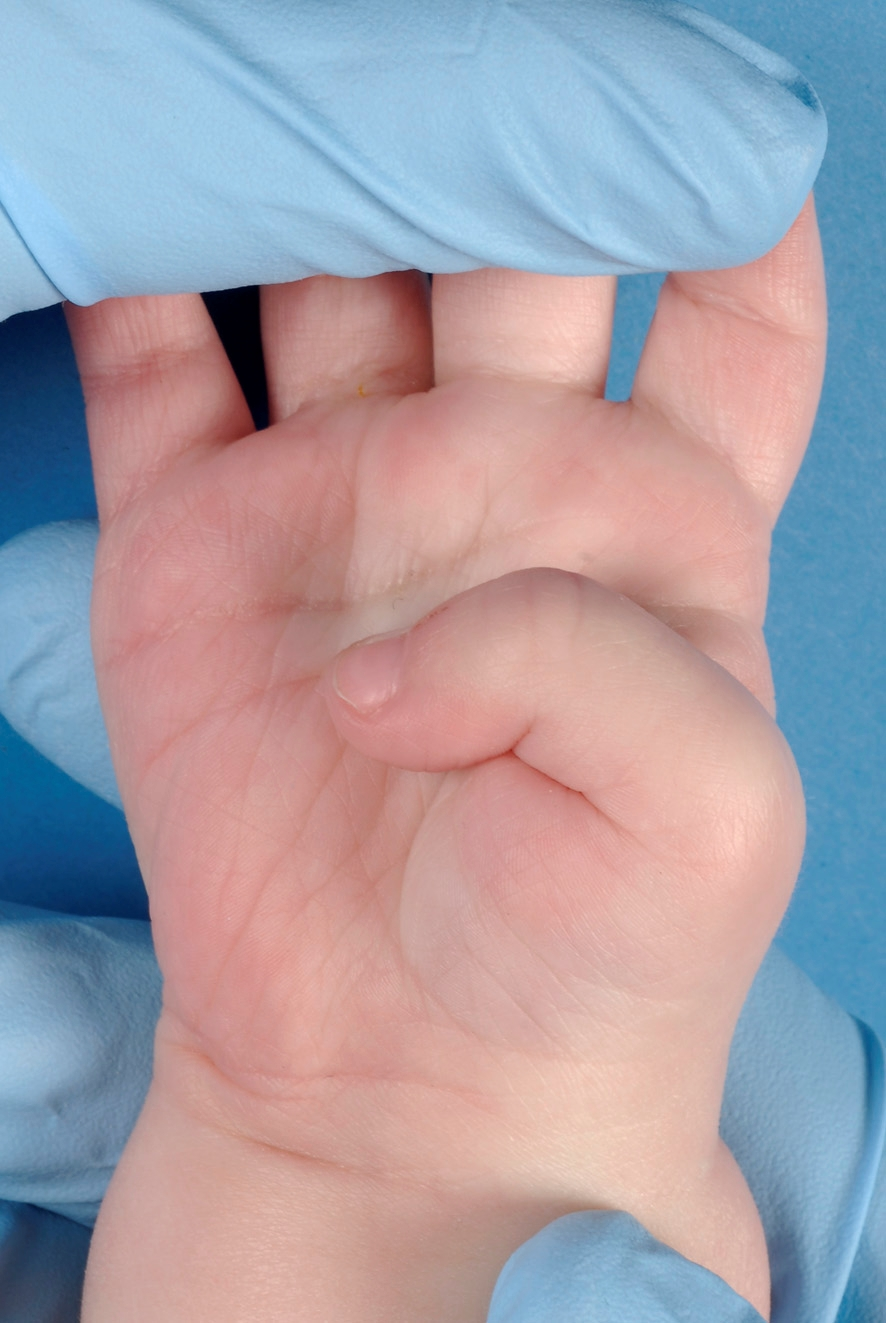
- Congenital clasped thumb

Congenital clasped thumb describes an anomaly which is characterized by a fixed thumb into the palm at the metacarpophalangeal joint in one or both hands. The incidence and genetic background are unknown. A study of Weckesser et al. showed that boys are twice as often affected with congenital clasped thumb compared to girls. The anomaly is in most cases bilateral (present in both hands). A congenital clasped thumb can be an isolated anomaly, but can also be attributed to several syndromes.

== Causes ==
The thumb contains five groups of muscle and/or tendons:

1. Extensor tendons (to stretch the thumb)
2. Flexor muscles/tendons (to bend the thumb)
3. Abductor muscles/tendons (to move the thumb outwards)
4. Adductor muscle (to move the thumb inwards)
5. Opposing muscles (to move the thumb opposite the small finger)

In order for the thumb to maintain a normal position, a strict balance between these groups is required. Weak or absent extensors and/or abductors (the extensor pollicis brevis tendon, the extensor pollicis longus tendon or, rarely, the abductor pollicis longus tendon), can cause a disbalance, leading to an abnormal position of the thumb: congenital clasped thumb. There is also the possibility that two tendons are affected simultaneously.

The following tendon deviations can induce congenital clasped thumb:

- The flexor tendons are too short (the thumb is drawn into the palm)
- The abductor tendons are hypoplastic or absent
- The extensor tendons are hypoplastic or absent

Furthermore, a tight thumb web space (the area between thumb and index finger) can contribute to congenital clasped thumb. The thumb cannot be properly abducted (moved outwards), if the web space is too tight.

To summarize, the causes of congenital clasped thumbs may vary between patients and can sometimes be a combination of the preceding components. Treatment should be tailored to all occurring components in order to achieve good results.

== Diagnosis ==
Diagnosing the congenital clasped thumb is difficult in the first three to four months of life, as it is normal when the thumb is clutched into the palm in these first months. Diagnoses that cause the same flexion or adduction abnormalities of the thumb are:

- Congenital clasped thumb
- Congenital Trigger thumb (flexion of the interphalangeal joint) - Trigger finger
- Spasticity: overstimulation of muscles

Syndrome associated flexion-adduction of the thumb:

- Freeman–Sheldon syndrome (a congenital, heritable affection of the face, the hands, the feet and some joints)
- Distal arthrogryposis
- MASA syndrome
- X-linked hydrocephalus
- Adducted thumb syndrome
- Waardenburg syndrome
- Whistling face syndrome (Freeman–Sheldon syndrome)
- Digitotalar dysmorphism
- Multiple pterygium syndrome

=== Classification ===
There are a few different classifications conceived to categorize the spectrum of variety of congenital clasped thumb. In literature, X classifications have been described for clasped thumb. The two most relevant of the existing classifications, to our opinion, are the classifications of McCarrol and Tjuyuguchi et al.

The most global format is the classification of McCarrol, which divides the congenital clasped thumbs into two groups. Group I includes the supple clasped thumb, when the thumb is only passively correctable. While complex clasped thumbs, thumbs which cannot be moved neither passively or actively, belong to group II.

Tjuyuguchi et al. designed a classification existing of three groups:

- Group I: The supple clasped thumb, where the thumb is passively abductable and extendable against the resistance of thumb flexors, without other digital anomalies.
- Group II: The clasped thumb with hand contractures, where the thumb is not passively extendable and abductable, with or without other digital anomalies.
- Group III: The clasped thumb which is associated with arthrogryposis.

== Treatment ==
Treatment of congenital clasped thumb includes two types of therapy: conservative and surgical.

=== Conservative treatment ===
Treatment of all categories of congenital clasped thumbs should start with either serial plaster casting or wearing a static or dynamic splint for a period of six months, while massaging the hand. Extension by splinting shows reduction of the flexion contracture. To gain optimal results, it is important to start this treatment before the age of six months. The result of this therapy is better in less severe deformities. In most uncomplicated cases, a satisfactory result can be gained when splint therapy starts before the age of six months. Splinting should be tried for at least three months and possibly for as long as six months or longer. If the result of splint therapy stagnates, surgery treatment is indicated.

=== Surgical treatment ===
Surgical treatment should be considered in patients who have not been treated at younger age or when conservative therapy fails. Surgery is recommended during the age of three to five years.

Techniques

- Release the thumb web space: it is possible to widen and deepen the area between the thumb and the index finger when it is too tight. To achieve this, a transposition flap or four-flap or five-flap Z-plasty can be used.
  - Transposition flap: skin flaps of the index finger and/or the thumb are moved to the web space.
  - Four-flap or five-flap Z-plasty: the web space is widened and deepened with skin of the web space itself.

- Tendon transfer: a technique usually considered for young children, in which tendons of index finger or little finger are used to make an adequate new extensor tendon for the thumb.

Other procedures

- Arthrodesis: fixing the metacarpophalangeal joint of the thumb in a more extension position.
