= L1 family =

Neurofascin

Identifiers
- Symbol: L1
- InterPro: IPR026965
- Membranome: 214
Available protein structures:
- PDB: IPR026965
- AlphaFold: IPR026965

The L1 family is a family of cell adhesion molecules that includes four different L1-like proteins. They are members of the immunoglobulin superfamily (IgSF CAM). The members of the L1-family in humans are called L1 or L1cam, CHL1 (close homologue of L1), Neurofascin and NRCAM (NgCAM related cell adhesion molecule). L1 family members are found on neurons, especially on their axons. Sometimes they are found on glia, such as Schwann cells, radial glia and Bergmann glia cells and, as such, are important for neural cell migration during development. L1 family members are expressed throughout the vertebrate and invertebrate kingdoms.

L1 family members are able to bind to a number of other proteins. As cell adhesion molecules, they often bind "homophilically" to themselves; for example L1 on one cell binding to L1 on an adjacent cell. L1 family members also bind "heterophilically" to members of the contactin or CNTN1 family. L1 family members bind to many cytoplasmic proteins such as Ankyrins, ezrin-moesin-radixin (ERM) proteins, signaling molecules like src (src gene) and erk (Extracellular signal-regulated kinases) and proteins important in trafficking, such as AP-2.

NrCAM and neurofascin both have class 1 PDZ domain binding motifs at their COOH termini. NrCAM can bind to SAP102 and other members of the MAGUK family.

== Function ==
The importance of L1 in neural development has been revealed in several ways. In humans, mutations in the L1 gene can have devastating consequences. In extreme cases, babies are born with a fatal condition of hydrocephalus ("water on the brain"). Children with less severe mutations typically exhibit mental retardation and difficulty in controlling limb movements (spasticity). Autopsies on patients that have died of an L1-deficiency disease reveal a remarkable condition: they are often missing two large nerve tracts, one that runs in the two halves of the brain and the other that runs between the brain and the spinal cord. The absence of such nerve tracts suggests that L1 is involved in the growth of axons within the embryonic nervous system."**
