= NFASC =

Protein-coding gene in humans

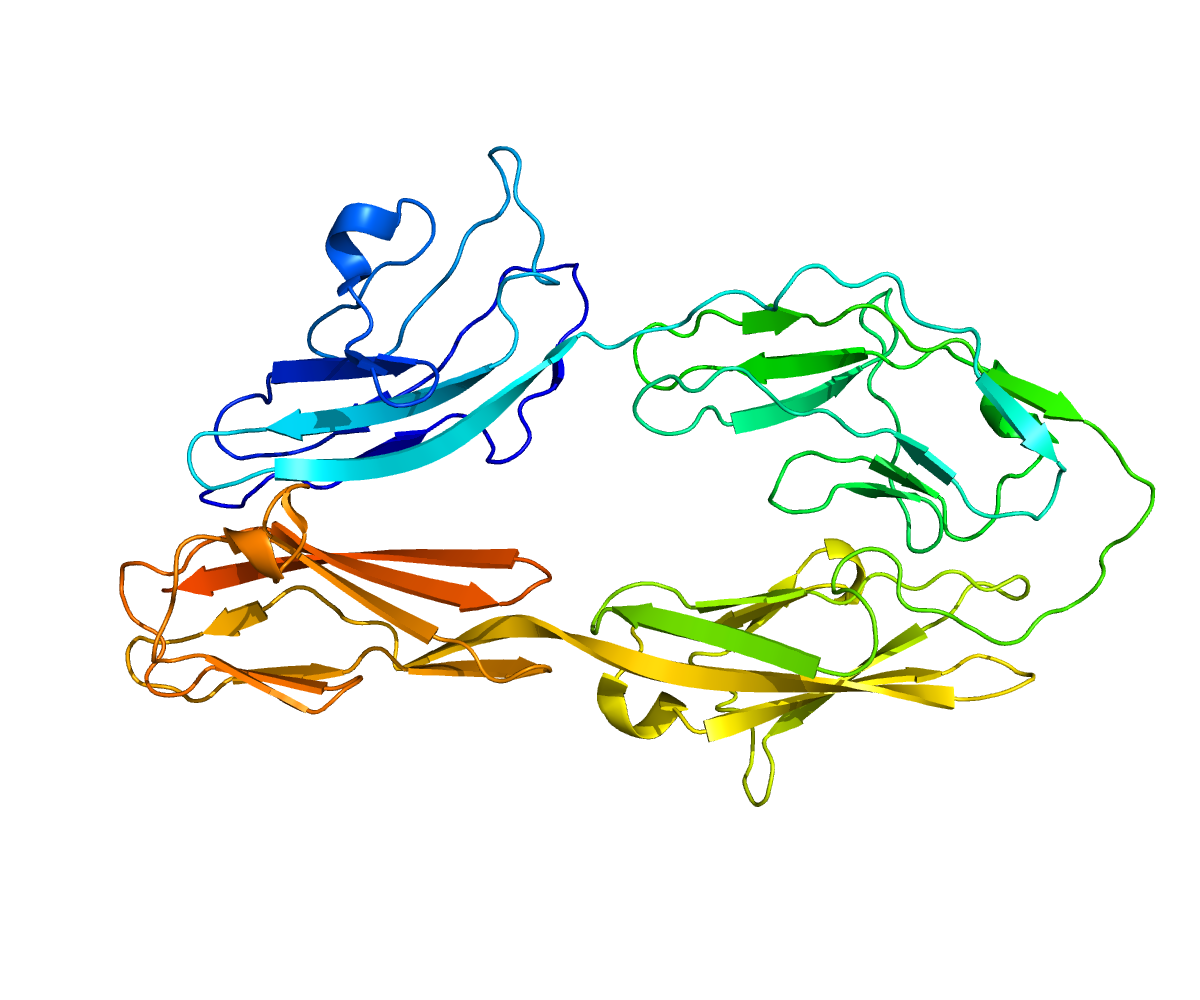

Identifiers
- Aliases: NFASC, NF, NRCAML, neurofascin, NEDCPMD
- External IDs: OMIM: 609145; MGI: 104753; GeneCards: NFASC
Available structures
PDB	Ortholog search: PDBe RCSB
PDB	List of PDB id codes 3P3Y, 3P40

Gene location (Human)
Chr.	Chromosome 1 (human)
Band	1q32.1	Start	204,828,651 bp
Band	1q32.1	End	205,022,822 bp

Gene location (Mouse)
Chr.	Chromosome 1 (mouse)
Band	1 E4|1 57.42 cM	Start	132,492,428 bp
Band	1 E4|1 57.42 cM	End	132,669,535 bp
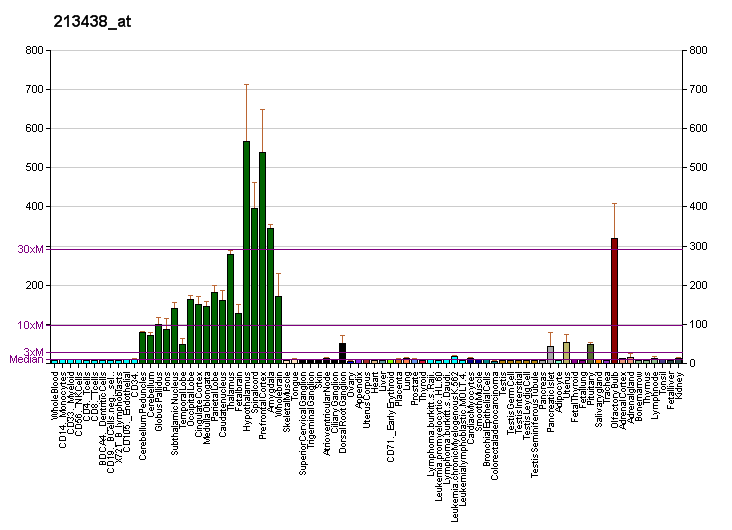
RNA expression pattern
Bgee	Human / Mouse (ortholog); Top expressed in: inferior olivary nucleus; lateral nuclear group of thalamus; external globus pallidus; corpus callosum; dorsal motor nucleus of vagus nerve; inferior ganglion of vagus nerve; glomerulus; metanephric glomerulus; pars reticulata; pars compacta / Top expressed in: neural layer of retina; visual cortex; primary visual cortex; central gray substance of midbrain; cerebellar cortex; superior cervical ganglion; superior frontal gyrus; anterior horn of spinal cord; pontine nuclei; lumbar subsegment of spinal cord; More reference expression data
BioGPS	More reference expression data
Gene ontology
Molecular function	protein domain specific binding; protein binding; protein binding involved in heterotypic cell-cell adhesion
Cellular component	integral component of membrane; membrane; focal adhesion; myelin sheath; plasma membrane; Schwann cell microvillus; intracellular anatomical structure; axon; paranodal junction; axon initial segment; paranode region of axon; extracellular exosome; node of Ranvier; ficolin-1-rich granule membrane; dendrite; integral component of plasma membrane
Biological process	clustering of voltage-gated sodium channels; peripheral nervous system development; transmission of nerve impulse; heterotypic cell-cell adhesion; synapse organization; protein localization to paranode region of axon; cell adhesion; paranodal junction assembly; myelination; protein localization to juxtaparanode region of axon; axon guidance; neutrophil degranulation; protein localization to plasma membrane
Sources:Amigo / QuickGO
Orthologs
Databases	NCBI: entry; OMA: entry
Species	Human	Mouse
Entrez	23114	269116
Ensembl	ENSG00000163531	ENSMUSG00000026442
UniProt	O94856	Q810U3
RefSeq (mRNA)	NM_001005387; NM_001005388; NM_001005389; NM_001160331; NM_001160332 NM_001160333; NM_015090; NM_001365986; NM_001378330; NM_001378331; NM_001378329	NM_001160316; NM_001160317; NM_001160318; NM_182716
RefSeq (protein)	NP_001005388; NP_001005389; NP_001153803; NP_001153804; NP_001153805 NP_055905; NP_001352915; NP_001365259; NP_001365260; NP_001365258	NP_001153788; NP_001153789; NP_001153790; NP_874385
Location (UCSC)	Chr 1: 204.83 – 205.02 Mb	Chr 1: 132.49 – 132.67 Mb
PubMed search
- Wikidata
View/Edit Human	View/Edit Mouse

Neurofascin is a protein that in humans is encoded by the NFASC gene.

== Function ==
Neurofascin is an L1 family immunoglobulin cell adhesion molecule (see L1CAM) involved in axon subcellular targeting and synapse formation during neural development.

== Clinical importance ==
A homozygous mutation causing loss of Nfasc155 causes severe congenital hypotonia, contractures of fingers and toes and no reaction to touch or pain.
