= MASA syndrome =

- Other names: Mental retardation-aphasia-shuffling gait-adducted thumbs syndrome
- This condition is inherited in an X-linked recessive manner.
- Specialty: Neurology

MASA syndrome is a rare X-linked recessive neurological disorder on the L1 disorder spectrum belonging in the group of hereditary spastic paraplegias a paraplegia known to increase stiffness spasticity in the lower limbs. This syndrome also has two other names, CRASH syndrome and Gareis-Mason syndrome.

== Signs and symptoms ==
The acronym "MASA" stands for the four main signs and symptoms associated with the syndrome: (1) mental retardation (mild to moderate intellectual disability), (2) aphasia (delayed onset of speech), (3) shuffling gait, and (4) adducted thumbs characterized by cleft palate, microcephaly, and dysmyelination. Affected males may also have a variable dilatation (widening) of the third heart ventricle. MASA has five other factors including hydrocephalus. The build-up is often caused by an obstruction that prevents proper fluid drainage. Spasticity of the lower limbs, causing the muscles to stiffen or tighten, preventing normal fluid movement. Aphasia, which is when someone loses the ability to understand or express speech, due to brain damage. Seizures, an abrupt, uncontrolled disturbance in the brain. Lastly, agenesis of the corpus callosum, a rare congenital disorder. It is characterized by a partial or complete absence (agenesis) of an area of the brain that connects the two cerebral hemispheres.

== Genetics ==
MASA syndrome has been associated with variants in the L1CAM gene which is an axonal glycoprotein that is essential for normal development of the central and peripheral nervous systems during the fetal period and postnatally. The symptoms are typically more intensive in males, due to the fact that males inherit only one X chromosome so a mutation in that one chromosome would cause the condition. Females are less likely to be affected because they have two X chromosomes. The prevalence is approximately 1 in 30,000 males. Fathers cannot pass the chromosomes to their sons, but only to their female offspring.

== Diagnosis ==
A diagnosis can be made when the clinical features have been identified, mainly the four common signs and symptoms. This can then be confirmed by single-gene sequencing, where the L1CAM gene is examined for any possible variations.

A diagnostic test prior-to-birth is possible and very reliable when the mother is a carrier of the diseased allele. First, it's necessary to determine the fetus' sex and then study the X-chromosomes inherited from the mother. The probability of transferring the variant X-chromosome to the descendants is 50% regardless of the sex of the fetus (as illustrated by the figure). Male descendants who inherit the varied X-chromosome will express the symptoms of the syndrome, on the other hand females who inherit the varied X-chromosome will become carriers of the mutated gene and will not show any symptoms or clinical features of the syndrome.

== Treatment ==
As of now, the only treatment for this disease is expertise in pediatrics, child neurology, neurosurgery, rehabilitation, and medical genetics. As some parts of the body can be damaged through time to time it can be useful to have the expertise to identify what other ways they can help for the complete health of the child.

== Previous cases ==
The first case of the MASA Syndrome was found in a boy in Asia. The patient was a 10-year-old boy with symptoms like, mild intellectual disability, bilateral adducted thumbs and corpus callosum hypoplasia. His family did not have any history with MASA syndrome. There is not just one specific doctor or scientist for this disorder. Since the L1 syndrome is composed of many X-linked disorders, more than one doctor or scientist may find the disorder in a person. Most of the doctors who find the disorder are Neuroscientists and some Pediatric Neurology specialists.
