= Down syndrome cell adhesion molecule like 1 =

Protein in humans

DSCAML1

Identifiers
- Aliases: DSCAML1, Dscaml1, 4921507G06Rik, 4930435C18Rik, BB239540, mKIAA1132, DSCAM2, DS cell adhesion molecule like 1
- External IDs: OMIM: 611782; MGI: 2150309; GeneCards: DSCAML1
Available structures
PDB	Ortholog search: PDBe RCSB
PDB	List of PDB id codes 1VA9

Gene location (Human)
Chr.	Chromosome 11 (human)
Band	11q23.3	Start	117,427,772 bp
Band	11q23.3	End	117,817,525 bp

Gene location (Mouse)
Chr.	Chromosome 9 (mouse)
Band	9|9 A5.2	Start	45,337,926 bp
Band	9|9 A5.2	End	45,665,010 bp
RNA expression pattern
Bgee	Human / Mouse (ortholog); Top expressed in: germinal epithelium; C1 segment; postcentral gyrus; entorhinal cortex; prefrontal cortex; hippocampus proper; corpus callosum; ganglionic eminence; Brodmann area 46; superior frontal gyrus / Top expressed in: neural layer of retina; subiculum; Rostral migratory stream; pretectal area; piriform cortex; temporal lobe; amygdala; dentate gyrus; anterior amygdaloid area; olfactory bulb; More reference expression data
BioGPS	n/a
Gene ontology
Molecular function	protein homodimerization activity; cell-cell adhesion mediator activity
Cellular component	integral component of membrane; cell surface; cell junction; plasma membrane; synapse; membrane; extracellular space; axon
Biological process	embryonic skeletal system morphogenesis; cell fate determination; central nervous system development; brain development; cell adhesion; dorsal/ventral pattern formation; axonogenesis; nervous system development; homophilic cell adhesion via plasma membrane adhesion molecules; axon guidance; dendrite self-avoidance
Sources:Amigo / QuickGO
Orthologs
Databases	NCBI: entry; OMA: entry
Species	Human	Mouse
Entrez	57453	114873
Ensembl	ENSG00000177103	ENSMUSG00000032087
UniProt	Q8TD84	Q4VA61
RefSeq (mRNA)	NM_020693; NM_001367904; NM_001367905	NM_001081270; NM_029039
RefSeq (protein)	NP_065744; NP_001354833; NP_001354834	NP_001074739
Location (UCSC)	Chr 11: 117.43 – 117.82 Mb	Chr 9: 45.34 – 45.67 Mb
PubMed search
- Wikidata
View/Edit Human	View/Edit Mouse

Down syndrome cell adhesion molecule like 1 is a protein in humans that is encoded by the DSCAML1 gene.

== See also ==
- DSCAM, Down syndrome cell adhesion molecule
- Fibronectin type III domain
- Immunoglobulin superfamily
