= DSCAM =

Protein-coding gene in the species Homo sapiens

Identifiers
- Aliases: DSCAM, CHD2-42, CHD2-52, CHD2, DS cell adhesion molecule
- External IDs: OMIM: 602523; MGI: 1196281; GeneCards: DSCAM

Gene location (Human)
Chr.	Chromosome 21 (human)
Band	21q22.2	Start	40,010,999 bp
Band	21q22.2	End	40,847,158 bp

Gene location (Mouse)
Chr.	Chromosome 16 (mouse)
Band	16 C4|16 57.02 cM	Start	96,590,840 bp
Band	16 C4|16 57.02 cM	End	97,170,752 bp
RNA expression pattern
Bgee	Human / Mouse (ortholog); Top expressed in: lateral nuclear group of thalamus; buccal mucosa cell; entorhinal cortex; external globus pallidus; postcentral gyrus; Brodmann area 46; superior frontal gyrus; Brodmann area 23; pars reticulata; internal globus pallidus / Top expressed in: lumbar subsegment of spinal cord; substantia nigra; dentate gyrus of hippocampal formation granule cell; medial geniculate nucleus; lateral geniculate nucleus; nucleus of stria terminalis; lateral septal nucleus; ventromedial nucleus; central gray substance of midbrain; medial dorsal nucleus; More reference expression data
BioGPS	n/a
Gene ontology
Molecular function	protein binding; cell-cell adhesion mediator activity; protein tyrosine kinase binding; netrin receptor binding
Cellular component	integral component of membrane; cell projection; membrane; growth cone; plasma membrane; synapse; extracellular region; axon; cell junction; integral component of plasma membrane; dendrite; soma
Biological process	negative regulation of cell adhesion; retina layer formation; locomotory behavior; dendrite morphogenesis; post-embryonic retina morphogenesis in camera-type eye; camera-type eye photoreceptor cell differentiation; positive regulation of axon extension involved in axon guidance; nervous system development; cell adhesion; dendrite self-avoidance; synapse assembly; positive regulation of phosphorylation; homophilic cell adhesion via plasma membrane adhesion molecules; axon guidance; netrin-activated signaling pathway
Sources:Amigo / QuickGO
Orthologs
Databases	NCBI: entry; OMA: entry
Species	Human	Mouse
Entrez	1826	13508
Ensembl	ENSG00000171587	ENSMUSG00000050272
UniProt	O60469	Q9ERC8
RefSeq (mRNA)	NM_001271534; NM_001389	NM_031174
RefSeq (protein)	NP_001258463; NP_001380	NP_112451
Location (UCSC)	Chr 21: 40.01 – 40.85 Mb	Chr 16: 96.59 – 97.17 Mb
PubMed search
- Wikidata
View/Edit Human	View/Edit Mouse

Down syndrome cell adhesion molecule, chordates

Identifiers
- Symbol: DSCAM_chordates
- InterPro: IPR033027
Available protein structures:
- PDB: IPR033027
- AlphaFold: IPR033027

DSCAM and Dscam are both abbreviations for Down syndrome cell adhesion molecule. In humans, DSCAM refers to a gene that encodes one of several protein isoforms.

Down syndrome (DS), caused by trisomy 21, is the most common birth defect associated with intellectual disability. DSCAM plays a crucial role in the development of DS: it is expressed in the developing nervous system, with the highest level of expression occurring in the fetal brain. When over-expressed in the developing fetal central nervous system, it leads to Down syndrome.

A homologue of the Dscam protein in Drosophila melanogaster has 38,016 isoforms arising from four variable exon clusters (12, 48, 33 and 2 alternatives, respectively). By comparison, the entire Drosophila melanogaster genome only has 15,016 genes. The diversity of isoforms from alternative splicing of the Dscam1 gene in D. melanogaster allows every neuron in the fly to display a unique set of Dscam proteins on its cell surface. Dscam interaction stimulates neuronal self-avoidance mechanisms that are essential for normal neural circuit development.

== History/discovery ==
The DSCAM protein structure is conserved, with roughly more than 20% amino acid identity across the deuterostomes and protostomes, and assuming an ancestral homologous gene, places the origin of the DSCAM gene at >600 million years ago. Since then, the DSCAM gene has been duplicated at least once in vertebrates and insects.

DSCAM was first identified in an effort to characterize proteins located within human chromosome band 21q22, a region known to play a critical role in Down syndrome. The name Down syndrome cell adhesion molecule was chosen for a combination of reasons including: 1) chromosomal location, 2) its appropriate (normal) expression in developing neural tissue, and 3) its structure as an Ig receptor related to other cell adhesion molecules (CAMs).

== Gene ==
The DSCAM gene has been identified in the DS critical region. Dscam is predicted to be a transmembrane protein and a member of the immunoglobulin (Ig) superfamily of cell adhesion molecules. It is expressed in the developing nervous system with the highest level of expression occurring in the fetal brain. When this gene is over-expressed in the developing fetal central nervous system, it leads to Down syndrome. Diverse glycoproteins of cell surfaces and extracellular matrices, operationally termed as 'adhesion molecules' are important in the specification of cell interactions during development as well as maintenance and regeneration of the nervous system.

Another DSCAM-like gene, DSCAML1, is located on chromosome band 11q23, a locus associated with Gilles de la Tourette and Jacobsen syndromes.

Some intriguing changes in the gene structure of DSCAM have occurred in arthropods where several duplications of exons generated three large tandem arrays that are alternatively spliced. This alternative splicing of individual exon sequences within an array occurs in a mutually exclusive and combinatorial manner allowing for expression of tens of thousands of Dscam isoforms. In the arthropods' genomes these three large exon arrays encode the N-terminal halves of the second and third Ig domains and the full Ig7 domain. The different structures of these isoforms lead to differences in binding interactions. Crystal structures of two D. melanogaster isoforms (with the first four Ig domains only), D9.9 and D1.34 (PDB: 2V5R, 2V5S) shows large variations in their binding epitopes and dimerization interface and conformations. Much of the difference is found the Ig3 domain loop.

Comparing the homology between genes and their products, is fundamental in understanding the phylogenetic relationship across the evolutionary pathway. In addition to the thousands of isoforms that can be populated from a single DSCAM of one species, DSCAM also demonstrates a diverse array of homology across species. Below are the genes, mRNA transcripts, and proteins identified as homologs of Down syndrome adhesion molecule.

Homologs
Species	Gene	mRNA	Protein
H. sapiens	DSCAM	NM_001389.3	NP_001380.2
P. troglodytes	DSCAM	XM_001171538.1	XP_001171538.1
M. mulatta	DSCAM	XM_002803124.1	XP_002803170.1
C. lupus	DSCAM	XM_544893.3	XP_544893.3
B. taurus	DSCAM	XM_002685111.2	XP_002685157.1
M. musculus	Dscam	NM_031174.4	NP_112451.1
R. norvegicus	Dscam	NM_133587.1	NP_598271.1
G. gallus	DSCAM	XM_416734.3	XP_416734.3
D. rerio	dscam	NM_001030224.1	NP_001025395.1
D. melanogaster	CG42330	NM_001043131.2	NP_001036596.2
A. gambiae	AgaP_AGAP007092	XM_308666.4	XP_308666.4

== Functions ==
Like many neuronal receptors, Dscam proteins have multiple functions, with repulsive and attractive roles that are dependent on the type of ligand that they interact with.

=== Immunity ===
Invertebrates do not have antibody-based immune systems. Instead, invertebrates rely on their innate immune system to eliminate infectious entities. The task of detecting and responding to a diverse pool of infectious agents are accomplished by germline encoded pattern recognition receptors (PRRs), which detect different patterns associated with the molecular markers to initiate an immune response. The role of Dscam in the fly immune response was demonstrated by an RNAi mediated depletion experiment of DSCAM in which it was found to be associated with the cells that play a role in the fly's immune system.

Dscam is found to have a role in phagocytosis in insects. The splicing pattern of the gene accompanying the phagocytic activity is specific to the type of infectious pathogen. In mosquitoes, the silencing of the Anopheles gambiae Dscam (AgDscam) disables its capacity to fight Plasmodium. The specificity of the Dscam recognition mechanism allows the mosquitoes of this species to differentiate the infection between bacteria and Plasmodium, and between Plasmodium berghei and Plasmodium falciparum.

=== Regulation of synaptogenesis ===
Self-avoidance is a mechanism where the neuronal processes from the cell repel each other during arborization and axon branching to avoid fasciculation and clumping. Self-avoidance is necessary to prevent extensive overlapping in the arborization pattern and to facilitate the coverage of the neuronal processes across different regions of the nervous system during development.

DSCAM is recognized to be involved in this process in both vertebrates and invertebrates during neural development. Cell aggregation assays show that cell adhesion molecules, such as DSCAM, belonging to the immunoglobulin superfamily bind homophilically and specifically. These molecules also appear to have a role in chemoattraction and repulsion.

Dscam1 of Drosophila may be one of the molecules involved in counteracting the netrin-dependent chemoattraction between neuronal processes during the neural development stage. As previously mentioned, the Dscam1 gene in Drosophila can encode 19008 extracellular domains, which bind homophilically and with isoform specificity. The isoform-specific binding properties of Dscam, during homophilic repulsion, are the basis of self-avoidance, which is a crucial developmental mechanism for uniform distribution of axonal and dendritic processes in the formation of synaptic fields. The neurons express a stochastic array of Dscam1 isoforms on their cell surface. Cells that have the same isoform patterns displaced on their surface, recognize the other as 'self', which leads to self-avoidance with the processes of neurons of the same subtype homophilically repelling from each other.

In addition to homophilic repulsion, Dscam1 mediates repulsion between neurites of different subtypes based on the specific isoform patterns displayed on the cell surface. This is called cell-type specific avoidance. The photoreceptor terminals of Drosophila form synapses with the postsynaptic invariant synapses that connect a pair of postsynaptic elements. Dscam is thought to aid this process by regulating the synaptic specificity through exclusion of inappropriate synaptic combination at the contact site.

Furthermore, DSCAM is thought to have a role in 'tiling' during Drosophila's neuronal development. Tiling is a mechanism in which the processes from cells that share the same function work to create nerve bundles in a defined territory to create a pattern of non-overlapping dendritic or axonal fields. Dscam1 and Dscam2 appear to be involved in axonal branching and tiling in Drosophila. Tiling occurs when homophilic repulsion mediated by Dscam2 prevents the processes of the same class of cells from overlapping. While both Dscam1 and Dscam2 mediate homophilic repulsion, the Dscam2 gene (unlike Dscam1) only encodes two alternative isoforms and thus lacks possible molecular diversity. Consequently, the role of Dscam2, in either self-avoidance or cell-type-specific avoidance, occurs depending on which isoform or ratio of isoforms that the neuron expresses.

== Interactions ==
Many Ig superfamily molecules bind homophilically and heterophilically, and Dscam/DSCAM proteins are no exception. Vertebrate DSCAMs and DSCAML1s have not only been shown to bind homophilically (i.e., DSCAM–DSCAM or DSCAML1–DSCAML1, and not DSCAM–DSCAML1), but also have cell-type specific, mutually exclusive, expression patterns. Due to the combinatorial use of alternative exons, the homophilic binding specificity of Drosophila Dscam is amplified to tens of thousands of potential homodimers. Biochemical assays (cell-to-cell and bead-to-cell binding assays) were used to demonstrate that isoform-specific homodimerization occurs with remarkable binding specificity. This reveals that Dscam diversity can give rise to >18,000 distinct homodimers.

== Clinical significance ==
The role of Ig-CAMs in human development and disease is only beginning to be elucidated. This may be of particular interest with respect to the DSCAMs, as DSCAM maps to chromosome 21 in a region critical for the neurocognitive and other defects of Down syndrome and DSCAML1 maps to chromosome 11 in a region whose deletion is associated with 11q deletion syndrome. This gives rise to neurocognitive defects and a subset of other defects which are similar to those seen in DS, including psychomotor retardation, Strabismus, Epicanthus, Telecanthus, carp-shaped upper lip, low-set dysmorphic ears, and cardiac defects. The level of DSCAM expression is increased by more than 20% in the DS brain. Given its identity as a potential neural morphogen and its expression in the cerebral and cerebellar cortices from the earliest stages in their development, it is not unreasonable to suggest that this level of DSCAM over-expression may contribute to the pre- and post-natal defects of DS, particularly, the cerebral and cerebellar hypoplasia and the abnormalities of the dendritic tree. Further, a role for DSCAM over-expression in contributing to the defects of cortical lamination seen in DS is supported by the fact that disruptions in other genes expressed by Cajal–Retzius cells, such as Reelin and LIS1, cause severe defects in neuroblast migration and cortical lamination.

A study of congenital heart defect (CHD) investigated the polygenic effect of DSCAM with other genes. Under normal physiological conditions, DSCAM and COL6A2 work jointly in Drosophila to mediate cell matrix adhesion. However, over-expressing DSCAM and COL6A2 in the Drosophila and mouse heart, resulted in a high mortality rate in addition to several serious heart defects, including atrial septal defects and cardiac hypertrophy. The interaction between DSCAM and COL6A2 and their combined effects were also observed in the H9c2 cardiac cell line with incidence of cardiac hypertrophy. While other gene combinations were screened to test the polygenic effect on the cardiac disorder, the DSCAM – COL6A2 pair was found to cause the most severe adverse effect in Drosophila. Translating the result to human cases of heart defects in DS patients require more study due to species-specific variance in the gene expression level. Nonetheless, the finding that DSCAM exerts a synergistic effect on the cardiac disease progression, upon disrupted expression level, allows future research on its role in some other major diseases.

== See also ==
- IgSF CAM
