= Role of cell adhesions in neural development =

Cellular adhesions can be defined as proteins or protein aggregates that form mechanical and chemical linkages between the intracellular and extracellular space. Adhesions serve several critical processes including cell migration, signal transduction, tissue development and repair. Due to this functionality, adhesions and adhesion molecules have been a topic of study within the scientific community. Specifically, it has been found that adhesions are involved in tissue development, plasticity, and memory formation within the central nervous system (CNS), and may prove vital in the generation of CNS-specific therapeutics.

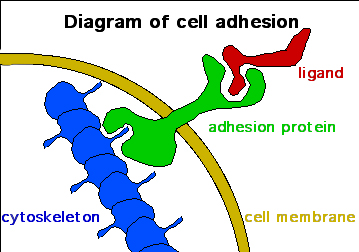
Image courtesy of Wikipedia user JWSchmidt under the GNU Free Documentation License

== Adhesion classifications ==
- Cell-cell adhesions provide chemical and mechanical connections between adjacent cells. Of special importance to neuronal tissue development are the subcategory n-cadherins. These cadherin molecules have been shown to be important in formation of the CNS structure, as well as neuronal migration along glial fibers.
- Cell-'Extra-Cellular Matrix' (ECM) adhesions also form mechanical and chemical linkages, but the connection occurs between cellular-matrix and the extra-cellular matrix through a plethora of adhesive proteins that form cohesive functional units. These focal adhesion plaques are highly dynamic in nature and undergo a maturation process through which they have altered functionality and protein content. Maturation stages are summarized in the following table:

Adhesion Classification	Approximate Size
Nascent	0.25 μm
Focal Complex	0.5 μm
Focal Adhesion	1-5 μm
Fibrillar Adhesion	>5 μm

== Adhesions role in cell migration ==
During early development, cell migration plays a crucial role in neuronal tissue organization. Although still largely under investigation, networks of highly ordered neurons are known to be a vital component of the nervous systems communication with the body. A major mechanism of cellular migration is the translation of internal force, to the external environment. Force transmission can occur through a variety of mechanisms, though adhesion complexes between cell-cell and cell-extracellular matrix (ECM) are a known to be chief mechanisms of this activity. Cell migration is generally classified with four cell processes:

1. Leading edge protrusion
2. Adhesion formation
3. Cell body translation
4. Trailing edge adhesion detachment

The coordination of these processes allows for the efficient migration of cells through their environment.

=== Cadherin dependent migration ===
Scaffold cell-dependent migration, in which neuronal cadherin (N-cadherin) adhesive molecules are tightly regulated, provides one mode of motility in developing neuron tissue. During cell migration, N-cadherin binds the neuron to a glial fiber, and allows for transfer of force, generated by an intracellular actin network treadmilling, to the glial fiber. Force transmission across the cell-glial fiber interface sums over many individual N-cadherin/glial-fiber interactions, allowing required levels of traction force essential for migration. It has also been shown that these adhesive cadherin molecules are internalized, and recycled by the migratory neuron. This cadherin recycling mechanism is thought to be substantial in the neural adhesion-based migratory pathway. Cadherin based migration is essential to tissue organization in the central nervous system, specifically in cortical layer formation.

It has also been suggested that the N-cadherin pathway may be crucial in neuron differentiation, as knockdown of the N-cadherin pathway leads to premature neuron differentiation.

=== Integrin dependent migration ===
Integrin dependent cell migration can be described as protein plaques that form the mechanical linkage between the intracellular and extracellular environments. One major components of this classification of cell migration, integrin, is a trans-membrenal protein dimer, which binds ECM components on its external domains and actin cytoskeletal components on its intra-cellular domains. These adhesions couple forces between the intracellular and extracellular space through both actin retrograde flow mechanisms (which have been described as a molecular clutch), and through actin-myosin protein contraction machinery. It is thought that these adhesions are involved in mechanosensing, that is, they respond both physically and chemically when exposed to various physical environments.

== Adhesion-related mechanisms involved in neuronal tissue development ==
=== Growth cone extensions ===
Growth cones function as structural and chemically sensitive axon-directing cellular organelles. Growth cones are highly dynamic in nature and contain a dynamic actin cytoskeleton in their peripheral region undergoing a constant retrograde flow. This retrograde force provides a mechanism for the growth cone to respond to direction cue, thereby directing neuronal axons. Growth cones are known to respond to various mechanical cues, which may be vital in proper nervous system development as growth cones experience a wide variety of mechanical environments as they navigate the extracellular space. Research suggests that growth cones from different regions of the brain may respond to mechanical cues differently. It has been demonstrated that neural cells located in the hippocampus aren't sensitive to varying mechanical stiffness as it related to outgrowth, where cells originating from the dorsal root ganglion show maximal outgrowth on surfaces of approximately 1 kPa. Both hippocampal and dorsal root ganglion neural growth cones show increased traction force generation on increased stiffness substrates. Growth cones utilize integrin migratory machinery such as integrins, but are not a class of cell migration.

=== Thy-1 adhesion protein ===
Thy-1 (or CD90.2) is a membrane bound glycoprotein that has been shown to be involved in the axon guidance pathway. This protein has been shown to be highly mobile, as it contains a GPI membrane anchor. Although much of the details are elusive, it is known that thy-1 interacts with the protein dimer integrin found on astrocytes, forming aggregates that can inhibit neurite outgrowth and extension. Thy-1 has also been shown to have involvement in the src-family kinase pathway. This astrocyte-neuron feedback has been proposed as a mechanism involved in CNS tissue repair post-injury, as a down regulation of thy-1 may lead to enhanced neurite outgrowth. Additional research has shown that thy-1 expression in post natal humans is elevated for several weeks. This suggests that in addition to tissue repair, thy-1 might have roles in early CNS tissue development and organization.

=== L1 family protein ===
The L1 family of proteins are involved in neuronal migration, as well as in axon growth and proper synapse formation, and include L1CAM, CHL1, NrCAM and neurofascin. L1-Cell Adhesion Molecule (L1CAM) was first discovered to be important in neuron-related tissue development in the mid-1980s, and is a trans-membranal glycoprotein of approximately 200-220 kDa. On its extracellular domain, the L1CAM protein includes IgG-like and fibronectin-III (FN-III) repeats which allow for interaction with integrins and ECM proteins. Similarly to integrin, F1CAM expresses domains intracellularly that interact with the actin cytoskeleton. Supporting the claim that L1-family proteins are involved in CNS development is the finding that L1CAM is highly expressed in neuronal tissue during its early stages of growth, especially at the ends of axons. Some areas of the brain, such as the hippocampus, have been found to highly express L1CAM into adulthood, though the exact reason for this has not been elucidated.

Due to its involvement in neuronal development and axon guidance, it has been proposed that L1CAM and L1-family proteins may be useful therapeutics to treat tissue damage in the CNS. Some have even proposed that L1CAM expression is elevated in vivo during tissue repair, which would support the notion that it yields benefit during CNS tissue repair.

=== Mechanosensing in neurons ===
Mechanosensing is a process by which cells alter their bio-physical properties in response to mechanical cues present in the environment. It is well known that a wide-variety of cell types change their behavior to mechanical environmental signals.

In addition to providing force transmission to the ECM for neuron extension and development, Integrin mediated adhesions are also functional in these mechanosensing processes in neurons. Sensing of the external environments mechanical properties in vivo can determine cell behaviors such as differentiation and branching. It has been experimentally determined that increasing substrate stiffness (~2-80kPa) can result in sequestered neurite branching and branch length.

== Relevant neurological conditions ==
Several debilitating diseases are brought about from errors in neural development due in part to problems involving neural cell adhesions and adhesion mechanisms.

- CRASH syndrome (or L1 syndrome) is brought about by a mutation in the L1CAM gene on the x-chromosome, resulting in a malfunctioning L1CAM protein. CRASH (acronym) syndrome include the conditions:

Summary of CRASH conditions
Year	Comments
Corpus callosum hypoplasia	Incomplete corpus-callosum development
Retardation	Impaired cognitive function
Adducted thumbs	Abnormal thumb development
Spastic paraplegia	Stiffening and contraction in the lower limbs
Hydrocephalus	Abnormal accumulations of Cerebrospinal fluid within skull

- Additionally, studies have shown that alterations in the expression of the protein thy-1 may be partially responsible for the abnormal neuronal outgrowth observed in Alzheimer's patients. It was found that abnormal neural outgrowth and thy-1 presence were correlated spatially, though mechanistic work is still needed to better understand thy-1's involvement in this condition.
