= L1 syndrome =

- Other names: L1CAM syndrome, CRASH syndrome, Corpus callosum hypoplasia-retardation-adducted thumbs-spasticity-hydrocephalus syndrome
- Specialty: Pediatrics, neurology, medical genetics
- Usual onset: Neonatal
- Duration: Lifelong
- Risk factors: Family history
- Diagnostic method: Genetic testing
- Treatment: Supportive
- Prognosis: Varies depending on specific disorder
- Frequency: Unknown; HSAS 1 per 30,000 male live births

L1 syndrome is a group of mild to severe X-linked recessive disorders that share a common genetic basis. The spectrum of L1 syndrome disorders includes X-linked complicated corpus callosum dysgenesis, spastic paraplegia 1, MASA syndrome, and X-linked hydrocephalus with stenosis of the aqueduct of Sylvius (HSAS). It is also called L1CAM syndrome (for the disorder's causative gene) and CRASH syndrome, an acronym for its primary clinical features: corpus callosum hypoplasia, retardation (intellectual disability), adducted thumbs, spasticity, and hydrocephalus.

L1 syndrome can be caused by different variants in L1CAM, the gene that provides the information that allows the body to produce L1 cell adhesion molecule (sometimes called the L1 protein). The L1 cell adhesion molecule is a surface protein found on the surface of all neurons. It allows neurons to bind to one another and create synapses (connections where information is passed on from the axons of one neuron to the dendrites and cell body of another). As a result, L1 cell adhesion molecule is essential for the structural development of the brain and contributes to the ability to think, move, and develop memories. The type and severity of the L1CAM variant causing L1 syndrome in a particular person is directly related to the severity of symptoms and functional impairment that they experience.

There is no cure for L1 syndrome, and prognosis is often poor. Life expectancy for people with L1 syndrome can vary dramatically depending on the severity of the condition, with some dying shortly after birth and others reaching adulthood. Treatment for people with L1 syndrome is supportive and aims to improve quality of life and minimize functional impairment.

== Signs and symptoms ==
L1 syndrome presents as a spectrum ranging from mild to severe features. A genotype–phenotype correlation exists across the L1 spectrum: the specific genetic variant that causes an L1-spectrum disorder determines the severity of the L1 syndrome in that patient. Patients with truncating (loss-of-function) variants in L1CAM (which prevent the full synthesis of L1 (protein)) experience more severe features than patients with missense variants in L1CAM (which may result in an abnormal protein but do not prevent its synthesis). Illustrating this difference in L1 syndrome severity, up to 50% of infants born with L1 syndrome caused by a truncating mutation will die before the age of 3 years despite provision of best available medical treatment. In comparison, roughly 10% of infants born with L1 syndrome caused by a missense mutation will die before the age of 3 years.

Despite its presentation on a continuous spectrum, L1 syndrome is loosely divided into four discrete phenotypes.

=== Impacts of symptoms ===
People diagnosed with L1 syndrome often experience issues with respect to societal roles and interactions due to the severe physical and mental disabilities associated with the disorder. These issues can vary depending on the symptoms that manifest in a specific individual and the severity of those symptoms, which is ultimately determined based on where the individual is situated on the L1 syndrome spectrum.

Spasticity is one of the most common signs of L1 syndrome and is seen in all four major clinical phenotypes. It is characterized as the continuous contraction of certain muscles, leading to muscle stiffness which can interfere with normal movement and speech. In three of the major phenotypes (except HSAS) this spasticity is presented as spastic paraplegia, where the muscles of the lower limbs are stiff and continuously contracted. This spastic paraplegia often manifests itself as a gait (walking motion) disorder, specifically shuffling gait in MASA syndrome, which acts as a source of impairment and stress due to postural instability, and leads to poor quality of life and increased mortality.

Aphasia is also a common disorder, especially in people with MASA syndrome (a disorder on the L1 syndrome spectrum) and describes a range of language impairments with respect to syntax (structure), semantics (meaning), phonology (sound), morphology (structure), and/or pragmatics in language comprehension or expression. People with aphasia, as well as their family members, often experience a poor quality of life due to the social isolation and depression caused by this language impairment and therefore may seek therapy to enable functional and socially relevant communication. Therapy services to address aphasia in MASA syndrome include one-on-one sessions with a clinician, group therapy, or even computer-based therapy, which is becoming more popular given its accessibility.

Intellectual disabilities also contribute to the social difficulties faced by people with L1 syndrome, and can range from mild to severe depending on the person's location on the L1 syndrome spectrum. People with mild intellectual disability usually have an IQ around 50–70 (100 is the average) and are slower in all developmental areas, but they have no unusual physical characteristics and are able to blend in socially. Moderate intellectual disability characteristics include being able to maintain self care with some support from others, travel to familiar places in the community, communicate in simple ways, and having an IQ around 35–50. Severe intellectual disability is often seen in people with X-linked hydrocephalus with stenosis of the aqueduct of Sylvius (HSAS) (on the L1 syndrome spectrum) and has several key characteristics including the ability to understand speech but otherwise having very limited communication skills; the ability to learn daily routines and simple self care, but needing direct supervision in social settings and needing family support to live in a supervised home setting. Depending on the severity of the intellectual disability, people with L1 syndrome will have varying levels of difficulty in adapting to their social environments and may need considerable support from others to complete day-to-day tasks.

=== X-linked hydrocephalus with stenosis of the aqueduct of Sylvius ===
The aqueduct of Sylvius (cerebral aqueduct) highlighted in red within the skull. In X-linked hydrocephalus with stenosis of the aqueduct of Sylvius (HSAS), this aqueduct is abnormally narrow, leading to accumulation of excess cerebrospinal fluid (CSF) within the brain's ventricular system.

X-linked hydrocephalus with stenosis of the aqueduct of Sylvius (HSAS) is the most severe phenotype on the L1 spectrum and is predominantly known for its major feature: profound hydrocephalus, typically beginning before birth. Due to its prenatal onset (i.e., before the bones of the skull have fused together), hydrocephalus associated with HSAS results in progressive macrocephaly (abnormal enlargement of the skull) due to markedly increased intracranial pressure. The signs and symptoms of hydrocephalus can vary depending on severity and age of onset, however irritability (due to pain) and vomiting are common amongst infants with the condition. Without treatment, congenital hydrocephalus can be fatal in infancy. In less severe cases of untreated hydrocephalus, a child may progress beyond infancy but often experiences nausea and vomiting, missed developmental milestones (both physical and cognitive/social), diplopia (double vision), and papilledema (swelling of the optic disc) which can progress to permanent visual impairment due to increased intracranial pressure if definitive treatment is withheld. Neurological damage, caused by both hydrocephalus and poor neuronal development because of defects in the L1 cell adhesion molecule, results in nearly all people with HSAS experiencing severe intellectual disability.

People living with HSAS will also frequently experience spasticity, a condition causing some muscles to be continuously contracted, thereby causing stiffness of the body and challenges with walking and speaking. Spasticity is also known to cause difficulty in performing activities of daily living such as bathing and showering, dressing, and self-feeding.

Despite HSAS frequently being considered an isolated disorder of the central nervous system, its genetic basis also causes musculoskeletal defects that result in more than half of males with HSAS displaying thumbs that are adducted (clasped, or brought inwards towards the palm). Specifically, this abnormal presentation of the hand is due to congenital malformations in the extensor pollicis brevis and/or extensor pollicis longus muscle of forearm.

=== MASA syndrome ===
MASA syndrome is named after its four principal features: mental retardation, adducted thumbs (clasped, or brought inwards towards the palm), shuffling gait, and aphasia (a language disability affecting the comprehension and production of speech as well as reading and writing abilities).

== Diagnosis ==
Computed tomography scan showing enlargement of the lateral ventricles due to hydrocephalus, a feature suggestive of possible stenosis (narrowing) of the aqueduct of Sylvius (cerebral aqueduct).

A healthcare provider, usually a medical geneticist (a physician with special training in diagnosing and managing genetic disorders) can provide a clinical diagnosis of L1 syndrome by examining a patient and ordering certain imaging studies, however the presence of L1 syndrome can only be confirmed when a molecular diagnosis has been made through genetic testing.

Often, the diagnostic odyssey for a person with L1 syndrome begins prenatally (before they are born) when prenatal ultrasounds reveal non-specific brain abnormalities, ventriculomegaly, or a non-existent or underdeveloped corpus callosum. Fetuses with X-linked hydrocephalus with stenosis of the aqueduct of Sylvius (HSAS) will typically have hydrocephalus severe enough to be discovered upon routine fetal ultrasound as early as 18–20 weeks gestation. After birth, in the presence of suggestive features (such as macrocephaly), hydrocephalus can be confirmed with noninvasive imaging including head magnetic resonance imaging, computed tomography, or ultrasound showing ventriculomegaly, or direct measurement of intracranial pressure through invasive techniques such as lumbar puncture. Further, the spasticity found in patients with HSAS can be easily demonstrated by examining the deep tendon reflexes and the extensor plantar reflex (which will both be abnormally brisk and strong due to damage to the cortex and internal capsule of the brain).

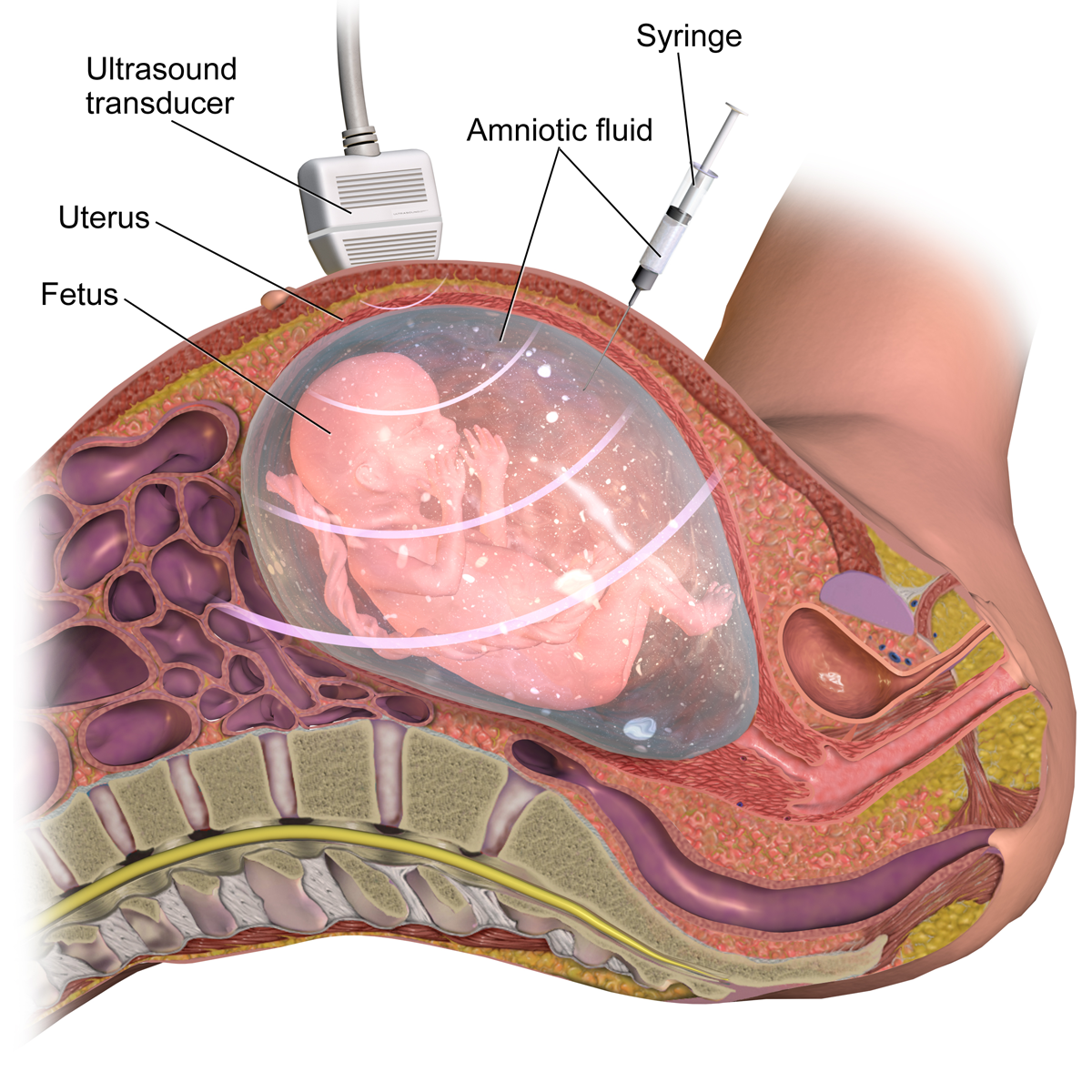
Amniocentesis being performed to extract amniotic fluid, usually around 4 teaspoons, that can be used as a sample for genetic testing. Amniotic fluid is a watery substance that surrounds the fetus in the womb.

There are various types of genetic testing that can be used to confirm an L1 syndrome diagnosis in a patient. After birth, genetic tests carry a low risk of physical complications and are minimally painful: for the patient, the process requires a small amount of blood being drawn from the arm using a needle. However, prenatal genetic testing carries significant risks for both the fetus and mother due to the need to remove genetic material from the fetus while it is still in utero. In order to conduct prenatal genetic testing, the mother and fetus must undergo either amniocentesis (the surgical puncturing of the amniotic sac, which holds the fetus in the womb) or, less frequently, chorionic villus sampling. Amniocentesis provides a sample of amniotic fluid that can be used to screen for sequence variants or chromosomal variants, whereas samples obtained through chorionic villus sampling can only be used to detect major chromosomal abnormalities (such as trisomy 21), making chorionic villous sampling less relevant in the context of diagnosing L1 syndrome (which is often caused by sequence variants). Amniocentesis (typically performed between 15 and 18 weeks of pregnancy) has a 1% risk of complications for mother and fetus, including miscarriage, while chorionic villus sampling (typically performed between 10 and 12 weeks of pregnancy) has a 2% risk of complications including miscarriage. Mothers carrying a fetus with suspected L1 syndrome will often elect to undergo amniocentesis despite its risk, rather than waiting to pursue lower-risk genetic testing after their child is born, because prenatal diagnostic results can inform considerations to terminate the pregnancy.

For any child born with multiple physical abnormalities, the first-line diagnostic test is chromosomal microarray.

== Management ==
To know the extent of the disease and the required needs of an individual diagnosed with L1 syndrome, some tests are recommended, namely, a head imaging study, a complete neurologic evaluation, developmental evaluation, evaluation for Hirschsprung disease (if a history of constipation is present). Consultation with a clinical geneticist or genetic counselor may also be helpful. Proper management of the manifestations of the L1 syndrome usually involves a multidisciplinary (involving a team specialized in more than one medical fields) approach. The patient's care may be coordinated by specialists in pediatrics, child neurology, neurosurgery, rehabilitation, and clinical genetics. To prevent secondary complications (conditions that occur in the course of a disease as a result), physiotherapy is recommended. Prior to birth, recognition of an affected fetus during pregnancy requires a plan involving multiple medical disciplines for a safe delivery for both mother and infant and to allow for an evaluation and possible treatment for hydrocephalus shortly after birth.

Hydrocephalus: Surgery should be performed as needed, to shunt cerebrospinal fluid (CSF) in order to reduce pressure inside the head (intracranial pressure).

Intellectual disability: The development of the individual should be monitored since development outcomes are variable among affected individuals; educational programs are needed for these individuals.

Adducted thumbs: Surgical procedures are generally not required, a splint may reduce the degree of the adduction, and in milder cases tendon transfer may improve the thumb function.

Spastic paraplegia: Currently there are no specific treatments to prevent or reduce neural degeneration. Treatments aim to reduce symptoms and improving balance, strength, and agility. Individuals should be evaluated periodically by a neurologist and physiatrist to evaluate progress made and to develop treatment strategies to maximize walking ability and reduce symptoms. General guidelines for follow-up and treatment can be followed while monitoring the neurologic features of the condition. Treatment for spastic paraplegia usually involves exercise to: (1) improve and maintain cardiovascular fitness (the heart's ability to supply oxygen to the tissues); (2) reverse the reduced functional capacity; (3) improve the mechanics of walking and gait in general; (4) improve the individual's independence and sense of control. Orthotics can be used to reduce the extension of the feet (toe-down), which causes dragging and falling. Of note, orthotics are usually used along with medications that decrease spasticity, such as Botox.
