= CHL1 =

Protein-coding gene in the species Homo sapiens

Identifiers
- Aliases: CHL1, CALL, L1CAM2, cell adhesion molecule L1 like
- External IDs: OMIM: 607416; MGI: 1098266; GeneCards: CHL1

Gene location (Human)
Chr.	Chromosome 3 (human)
Band	3p26.3	Start	196,763 bp
Band	3p26.3	End	409,417 bp

Gene location (Mouse)
Chr.	Chromosome 6 (mouse)
Band	6|6 E1	Start	103,487,547 bp
Band	6|6 E1	End	103,727,172 bp
RNA expression pattern
Bgee	Human / Mouse (ortholog); Top expressed in: Brodmann area 23; endothelial cell; superior frontal gyrus; sural nerve; spinal ganglia; postcentral gyrus; frontal pole; Brodmann area 10; trigeminal ganglion; middle temporal gyrus / Top expressed in: spermatid; subiculum; ventral tegmental area; lobe of cerebellum; lateral hypothalamus; dorsomedial hypothalamic nucleus; supraoptic nucleus; substantia nigra; cerebellar vermis; ventromedial nucleus; More reference expression data
BioGPS	n/a
Gene ontology
Molecular function	protease binding
Cellular component	integral component of membrane; membrane; plasma membrane; apical part of cell; extracellular region; dendrite; extracellular exosome
Biological process	negative regulation of neuron apoptotic process; cell differentiation; cognition; axon regeneration; adult locomotory behavior; neuron migration; nervous system development; multicellular organism development; cell adhesion; exploration behavior; neuron projection development; signal transduction; axon guidance
Sources:Amigo / QuickGO
Orthologs
Databases	NCBI: entry; OMA: entry
Species	Human	Mouse
Entrez	10752	12661
Ensembl	ENSG00000134121	ENSMUSG00000030077
UniProt	O00533	P70232
RefSeq (mRNA)	NM_001253387; NM_001253388; NM_006614	NM_007697
RefSeq (protein)	NP_001240316; NP_001240317; NP_006605	NP_031723
Location (UCSC)	Chr 3: 0.2 – 0.41 Mb	Chr 6: 103.49 – 103.73 Mb
PubMed search
- Wikidata
View/Edit Human	View/Edit Mouse

Neural cell adhesion molecule L1-like protein also known as close homolog of L1 (CHL1) is a protein that in humans is encoded by the CHL1 gene.

CHL1 is a cell adhesion molecule closely related to the L1. In melanocytic cells CHL1 gene expression may be regulated by MITF, and can act as a helicase protein during the interphase stage of mitosis.

The protein, however, has dynamic localisation, meaning that it has not only multiple roles in the cell, but also various locations.
