= Adducted thumb syndrome =

Rare genetic disease affecting palate, thumbs, and upper limbs

- Other names: Christian syndrome, craniostenosis arthrogryposis cleft palate
- Adducted thumb syndrome has a lysosomal recessive pattern of inheritance
- Causes: mutation in the CHST14 gene
- Frequency: 0.0001%

Adducted thumb syndrome recessive form is a rare disease affecting multiple systems causing malformations of the palate, thumbs, and upper limbs. The name Christian syndrome derives from Joe. C. Christian, the first person to describe the condition. Inheritance is believed to be autosomal recessive, caused by mutation in the CHST14 (carbohydrate sulfotransferase 14) gene.

== Signs and symptoms ==
This syndrome is characterised by typical facial appearance, slight build, thin and translucent skin, severely adducted thumbs, arachnodactyly, club feet, joint instability, facial clefting and bleeding disorders, as well as heart, kidney or intestinal defects. Severe psychomotor and developmental delay and decreased muscle tone may also be present during infancy. Cognitive development during childhood is normal.

== Diagnosis ==
The syndrome is associated with microcephaly, arthrogryposis and cleft palate and various craniofacial, respiratory, neurological and limb abnormalities, including bone and joint defects of the upper limbs, adducted thumbs, camptodactyly and talipes equinovarus or calcaneovalgus. It is characterized by craniosynostosis, and myopathy in association with congenital generalized hypertrichosis. Patients with the disease are considered intellectually disabled. Most die in childhood. Patients often have respiratory difficulties such as pneumonia, and from seizures due to dysmyelination in the brain's white matter. It has been hypothesized that the Moro reflex (startle reflex in infants) may be a tool in detecting the congenital clasped thumb early in infancy. The thumb normally extends as a result of this reflex.

== See also ==
- Adams–Oliver syndrome
- List of cutaneous conditions
- Tetrasomy 18p
