= HEPACAM2 =

Protein-coding gene in the species Homo sapiens

Identifiers
- Aliases: HEPACAM2, MIKI, HEPACAM family member 2
- External IDs: OMIM: 614133; MGI: 2141520; GeneCards: HEPACAM2

Gene location (Human)
Chr.	Chromosome 7 (human)
Band	7q21.2	Start	93,188,534 bp
Band	7q21.2	End	93,226,469 bp

Gene location (Mouse)
Chr.	Chromosome 6 (mouse)
Band	6|6 A1	Start	3,457,096 bp
Band	6|6 A1	End	3,498,298 bp
RNA expression pattern
Bgee	Human / Mouse (ortholog); Top expressed in: mucosa of ileum; mucosa of sigmoid colon; rectum; islet of Langerhans; palpebral conjunctiva; mucosa of transverse colon; jejunal mucosa; testicle; duodenum; human kidney / Top expressed in: islet of Langerhans; left colon; crypt of lieberkuhn of small intestine; ileum; jejunum; duodenum; intestinal villus; Paneth cell; right kidney; spermatocyte; More reference expression data
BioGPS	n/a
Gene ontology
Molecular function	protein binding
Cellular component	cytoplasm; microtubule organizing center; integral component of membrane; Golgi membrane; centrosome; cytoskeleton; membrane; Golgi apparatus; spindle; midbody
Biological process	cell cycle; cell division; centrosome cycle
Sources:Amigo / QuickGO
Orthologs
Databases	NCBI: entry; OMA: entry
Species	Human	Mouse
Entrez	253012	101202
Ensembl	ENSG00000188175	ENSMUSG00000044156
UniProt	A8MVW5	Q4VAH7
RefSeq (mRNA)	NM_001039372; NM_001288804; NM_001288810; NM_198151; NM_001346642	NM_178899
RefSeq (protein)	NP_001034461; NP_001275733; NP_001275739; NP_001333571; NP_937794	NP_849230
Location (UCSC)	Chr 7: 93.19 – 93.23 Mb	Chr 6: 3.46 – 3.5 Mb
PubMed search
- Wikidata
View/Edit Human	View/Edit Mouse

HEPACAM family member 2 is a protein that in humans is encoded by the HEPACAM2 gene.

== Function ==
This gene encodes a protein related to the immunoglobulin superfamily that plays a role in mitosis. Knockdown of this gene results in prometaphase arrest, abnormal nuclear morphology, and apoptosis.

Poly (ADP-ribosylation) of the encoded protein promotes its translocation to centrosomes, which may stimulate centrosome maturation. A chromosomal deletion including this gene may be associated with myeloid leukemia and myelodysplastic syndrome in human patients.
