= Neural cell adhesion molecule L1 =

Mammalian protein found in Homo sapiens

L1CAM

Identifiers
- Aliases: L1CAM, CAML1, CD171, HSAS, HSAS1, MASA, MIC5, N-CAM-L1, N-CAML1, NCAM-L1, S10, SPG1, L1 cell adhesion molecule
- External IDs: OMIM: 308840; MGI: 96721; GeneCards: L1CAM

Gene location (Human)
Chr.	X chromosome (human)
Band	Xq28	Start	153,861,514 bp
Band	Xq28	End	153,886,173 bp

Gene location (Mouse)
Chr.	X chromosome (mouse)
Band	X A7.3|X 37.43 cM	Start	72,897,384 bp
Band	X A7.3|X 37.43 cM	End	72,939,711 bp
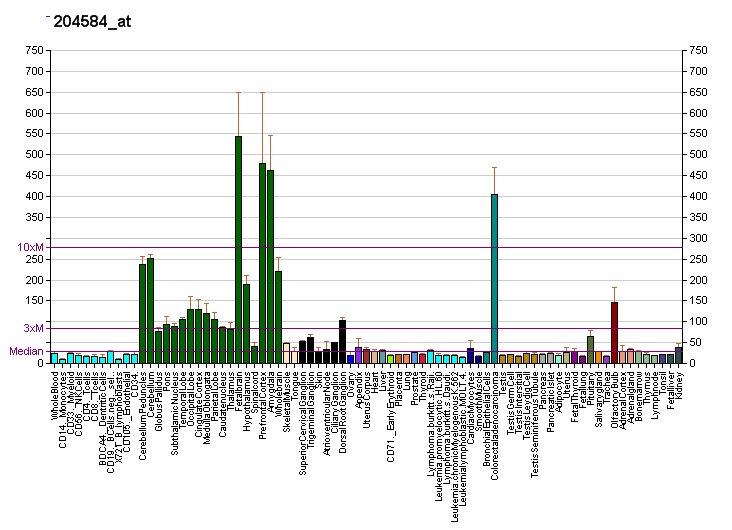

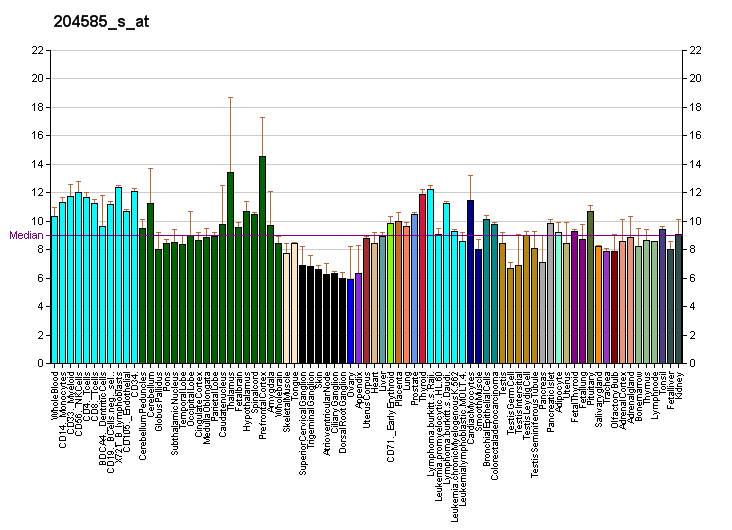
RNA expression pattern
Bgee	Human / Mouse (ortholog); Top expressed in: right hemisphere of cerebellum; spinal ganglia; trigeminal ganglion; cerebellar vermis; sural nerve; paraflocculus of cerebellum; olfactory bulb; Brodmann area 10; right frontal lobe; superior frontal gyrus / Top expressed in: medial dorsal nucleus; superior cervical ganglion; subiculum; lateral geniculate nucleus; barrel cortex; medial geniculate nucleus; ventromedial nucleus; paraventricular nucleus of hypothalamus; dorsomedial hypothalamic nucleus; nucleus accumbens; More reference expression data
BioGPS	More reference expression data
Gene ontology
Molecular function	protein binding; protein domain specific binding; axon guidance receptor activity
Cellular component	cell projection; growth cone; membrane; focal adhesion; cell surface; integral component of membrane; axonal growth cone; plasma membrane; axon; dendrite; soma; extracellular matrix; collagen-containing extracellular matrix
Biological process	multicellular organism development; nervous system development; positive regulation of axon extension; cell differentiation; leukocyte migration; cell adhesion; chemotaxis; cell-matrix adhesion; axon guidance; cell migration; neuron projection development; synapse organization; axon development; homophilic cell adhesion via plasma membrane adhesion molecules
Sources:Amigo / QuickGO
Orthologs
Databases	NCBI: entry; OMA: entry
Species	Human	Mouse
Entrez	3897	16728
Ensembl	ENSG00000198910	ENSMUSG00000031391
UniProt	P32004	P11627
RefSeq (mRNA)	NM_024003; NM_000425; NM_001143963; NM_001278116	NM_008478; NM_001374694
RefSeq (protein)	NP_000416; NP_001137435; NP_001265045; NP_076493	n/a
Location (UCSC)	Chr X: 153.86 – 153.89 Mb	Chr X: 72.9 – 72.94 Mb
PubMed search
- Wikidata
View/Edit Human	View/Edit Mouse

Neural cell adhesion molecule L1, NCAM-L1, is a transmembrane protein member of the L1 protein family, encoded by the L1CAM gene. This protein, of 200 to 220 kDa, is a neuronal cell adhesion molecule with a strong implication in cell migration, adhesion, neurite outgrowth, myelination and neuronal differentiation. It also plays a key role in treatment-resistant cancers due to its function. It was first identified in 1984 by M. Schachner who found the protein in post-mitotic mice neurons.

Mutations in the L1 protein are the cause of L1 syndrome, sometimes known by the acronym CRASH (corpus callosum hypoplasia, retardation, aphasia, spastic paraplegia and hydrocephalus).

== Tissue and cellular distribution ==
L1 protein is located all over the nervous system on the surface of neurons. It is placed along the cellular membrane so that one end of the protein remains inside the nerve cell while the other end stays on the outer surface of the neurone. This position allows the protein to activate chemical signals which spread through the neurone.

There are a wide variety of cells which express the protein L1, not only neuronal cells but also some non-neuronal ones. Cells which are known nowadays to express the protein L1 are: immature oligodendrocytes and Schwann cells, which are non-neuronal cells that provide support and protection for neurons and form myelin; T cells which are lymphocytes involved in cell-mediated immunity; other types of lymphocytes such as B cells and Monocytes. It is also expressed in intestinal epithelial progenitor cells, cerebellum neurons such as Cerebellum granule cell and Purkinje cells. Finally, it is expressed in multiple tumor cells for example Melanoma and lung carcinoma cells.

L1CAM is also frequently used as a marker of Extracellular Vesicles (EVs) originating from neuronal cells, although its presence specifically on neuron-derived EVs is debatable.

== Gene ==
The human L1CAM gene is found in X chromosome regions that are implicated in different neuromuscular diseases, and near the one associated with intellectual disability. The L1CAM gene is located in the long arm of X chromosome in Xq28 position.

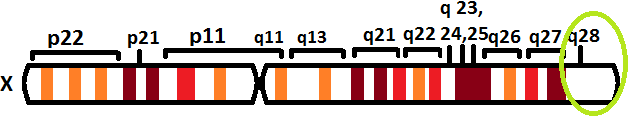
Location of L1CAM gene

== Structure ==
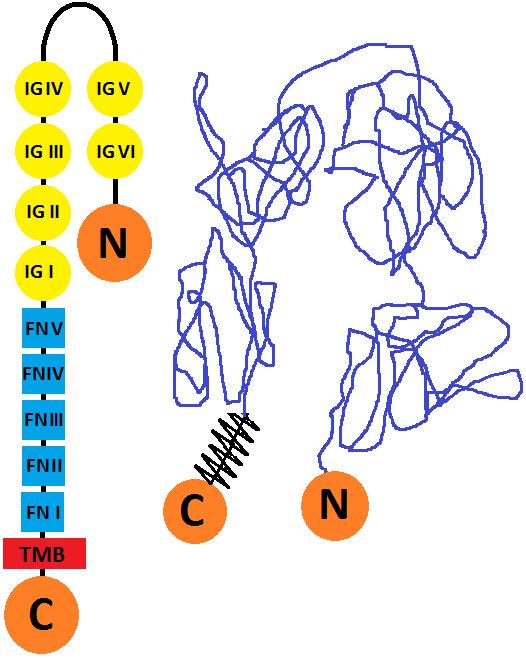
Schematic structure of L1CAM showing its domains.

The L1 cell adhesion molecule (L1CAM) is a cell surface glycoprotein found in humans (and other forms of life as mice, for example) which has a 1253 amino acid protein sequence. The extracellular portion is formed of six immunoglobulin domains followed by five fibronectin type III domains which are connected to a small intracellular domain by a transmembrane helix. The human protein is very similar to the one that is found in mice (they are 92% identical at amino acid level, this enabling the scientists to study its structure. There are other CAM proteins like Ng-CAM (found in chicken) which has lower similarities to the human one (they are 40% identical at the amino acid level). The comparative of the sequences from human, mouse, chick and Drosophila and its good conservation, indicates that the L1 immunoglobulin domain 2 and fibronectin type III domain 2 probably are functionally important.

== Function ==
L1 is an important protein for the development of the nervous system affecting both cell adhesion and motility.

=== Cell adhesion ===
L1 has a static function as a cell adhesion molecule which connects different cells. It is involved in the adhesion between neurons and in the growth and association of neurites called neurite fasciculation.

=== Cell motility ===
Motility promoting functions are related to the regulation of the movement of nerve cells during neural development. L1 is present in developing neurons and plays an important role in guiding new neurons into the correct positions and helping axons grow and make connections with other neurons. L1 is also involved in synaptic plasticity, which is the ability of synapses to strengthen or weaken, and it also plays a role in regeneration after trauma.

Some studies have proved that L1 has a role in tumor growth, tumor cell invasion, metastasis of melanoma, ovarian and colon cancer due to an overexpression of the protein L1 that improves cell motion of the malignant cells.

The domains of this protein promote homophilic interactions, where adhesion molecules on one cell interact with identical molecules on the other cell. And also heterophilic interactions, where an adhesion molecule on one cell works as a receptor that connects with a different molecule on the other cell. These interactions promote cell adhesion and regulation of signal transduction.

In addition, L1 participates in myelination processes, which are involved in the proliferation of myelin through the nervous system (specifically the progressive myelination of nerve axon fibers), by mediating the elongation of Schwann cells along the axon.

=== Nervous system ===
L1 is involved in neuron-neuron adhesion, neurite fasciculation, outgrowth of neurites, cerebellar granule cell migration, neurite outgrowth on Schwann cells and interactions among epithelial cells of intestinal crypts. As a consequence, mutations in the L1CAM gene cause the Nervous System to malfunction. The main disorders linked to this mutation are known by the acronym CRASH or can be also referred as L1 syndrome. This includes disorders such as HSAS, MASA syndrome, agenesis of the corpus callosum and spastic paraplegia. Lower limb spasticity, mental retardation, hydrocephalus and flexion deformity of the thumbs are some of the symptoms expressed mostly in male individuals who suffer from this condition. Although the pathological mechanisms leading to L1 syndrome are still unknown, about 200 mutations of the L1CAM gene have been identified and then associated with the syndrom. These mutations mostly affect structurally important key residues in the extracellular region of L1 causing alterations in the protein binding properties, which correlate to the impairment of neuronal physiological mechanisms such as cell adhesion or specific interacting with other molecules. Ankyrin interaction with L1CAM is an example of a protein binding that fails in CRASH patients due to a mutation that causes leucine and histidine to replace serine and tyrosine respectively, in the SFIGQY motif, where ankyrin should be bound in the L1CAM family cytoplasmic terminus. Ankyrin-L1CAM interaction is involved in the growth cone initiation, consequently, a failure in this interaction causes neurites to not reach synaptic target.

Furthermore, evidence shows there is a correlation between fetal alcohol spectrum disorder and L1 protein since ethanol inhibits L1-mediated adhesion and neurite outgrowth. Hirschsprung's disease has also been linked to a L1CAM malfunction.

== Transcription and synthesis ==
The gene that regulates L1CAM transcription is found in chromosome X. The L1CAM gene is 24,657 bp in length, and is made up of 28 exons. The alternative splicing of this gene leads to multiple transcript variants (there are 7 different transcripts of the gene), including some that have an alternate exon that is considered to be specific to neurons. L1 transcription is known to take place in human fetal brain and in neuroblastoma and retinoblastoma cell lines. L1 is also expressed in the rhabdomyosarcoma cell lines RD and A-204. Two forms of L1 can be found in humans, with the difference that one has a 12-bp cytoplasmic segment and the other lacks of it. The regulation of L1CAM expression in transcription is not fully comprehended. Two sites were verified in endometrial carcinoma cell lines and seem to be used in a specific manner depending on the cell type. There are two transcription beginning sites, located in two different exons (in front of a non-translated exon 0 and next to the first protein-coding exon 1). SLUG (SNAI2), a transcription factor, upregulates the expression of L1CAM.

== Sequences and different isoforms ==
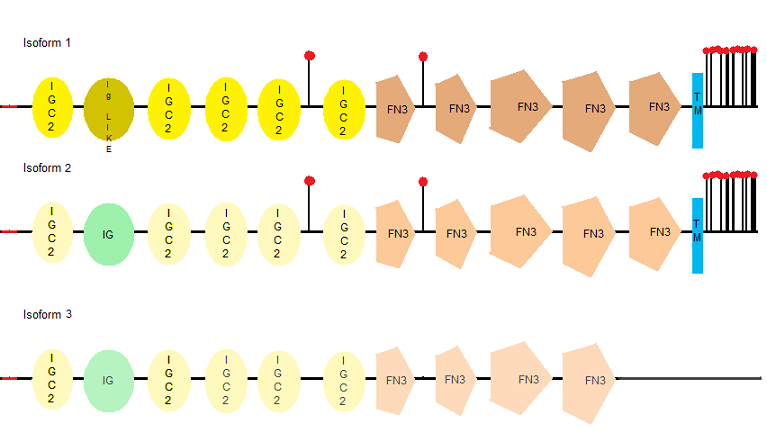
L1CAM different isoforms (1, 2 and 3)

L1CAM has three different isoforms, that differ in their amino acid sequency, because of alternative splicing (a process that allows obtaining different mRNA mature molecules from one primary transcript of mRNA). L1CAM isoform 1 is known as the canonical sequence. The main difference between them is where they can be found, for example, the full-length isoform (isoform 1), is the one usually found in neural cells, while the short one or nonneural isoform (isoform 2), is predominant in the other cell types.

	Length (n aa)	Mass (Da)	Sequence
Isoform 1 (fl-L1)	1,257	140,003	Canonical sequence.
Isoform 2 (sh-L1)	1,253	139,517	Differs from the canonical sequence in the amino acids between position 1177 and 1180, which aren't found in this isoform.
Isoform 3	1,248	138,908	Differs from the canonical sequence in the amino acids between position 26 and 31 where six amino acids are exchanged for a leucine and as the previous one, in the amino acids between position 1177 and 1180, which aren't found in this isoform.

== Interactions ==
L1 (protein) has been shown to interact with NUMB.

=== Ig-like domain interactions ===
L1CAM is capable of folding into a horseshoe configuration by the establishment of homophilic interactions within Ig-like domains of the same protein (the first and the second Ig motifs folding back onto the 4th and 3rd motifs). This conformation is essential for L1CAM being able to interact with other molecules and subsequently performing some of its most important functions.

Ig-like domains are implicated in many homophilic interactions with other L1CAM proteins located in adjacent cells. L1CAM molecules interact via the Ig (1-4)-like domains, allowing cell to cell adhesion. They are also important in the formation of heterophilic interactions with NCAM, TAG-1, F11 and receptor tyrosine kinases (specially during the development of the nervous system).

The six Ig motif of the L1 protein contains an Arg-Gly-Asp sequence which allows binding with diverse surface cell integrins. This interaction leads to a signaling cascade which activates focal adhesion kinases (FAK) which are then converted to its active state and form the FAK/SRC complex. The latest functions as an activator of mitogen-activated protein kinases. Another function derived from integrin binding is the activation of NF-κB which results in making cells more motile and invasive.

=== Fibronectin domain interactions ===
Fibronectin domains of L1 protein are also capable of binding cell surface integrins. They interact with fibroblast growth factor receptor 1, which suggests it may be linked to the modulating of neuronal differentiation.

=== Cytoplasmic tail interactions ===
The most important binding partners of the cytoplasmic tail of L1 proteins are ankyrins. The interaction is held in high-affinity binding sites located within the so-called "ank repeats" also known as membrane-binding domains. This interaction allows L1 protein connect with the cell's cytoskeleton. Also, L1 protein cytoplasmic tail can bind adaptor 2 (ADP), a key component of clathrin mediated endocytosis.

The fact this region contains some phosphorylation sites suggests L1 may be subject to regulation by kinases.

== Implications in cancer metastasis ==
L1CAM protein expression is normally restricted to neurons. However, it has been noticed there's L1CAM overexpression in all types of cancer cells, which has been associated with poor prognosis, tumor progression and metastasis. This up-regulation may not be necessarily associated with mutations in L1 transcription factors. It has been seen this protein plays a key role in inflammatory reactions as the ones taking place in the tissue surrounding a tumor. This could explain why this protein gets suddenly overproduced in tumor cells. L1CAM's diverse functions make tumor cells more aggressive and resistant. Their migratory and motility related functions may result key in cell epithelial–mesenchymal transition (EMT) allowing cells to lose cell to cell static junctions and apico-basal polarity leading to them becoming migratory and independent. Also, its capacity to form adhesive interactions within different cell types may result in an advantage for tumor cells when it comes to co-opt and invade the surrounding tissues or capillaries.

Once tumor cells become anchorage-independent and migratory, due to L1 up-regulation, they leave the tissue where they belong and migrate through the capillaries to other organs. One frequent destination of tumor cells is the brain. So to settle in the brain, tumor cells have to succeed in crossing the blood brain barrier (BBB) where they get exposed to the plasmin secreted by astrocytes. Plasmin breaks L1CAM and inhibits the malignant cell's migrating powers. However, recent studies have noted these cancer cells overproduce anti-PA serpins, which are the usual inhibitors of plasmin, allowing them to cross the BBB and succeed in metastasis.

== Possible therapies involving L1CAM ==
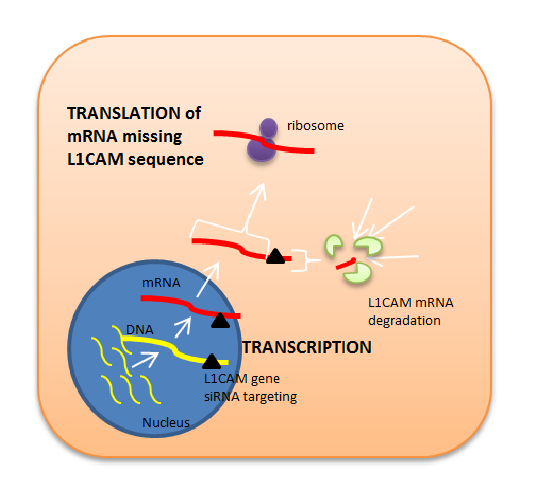
L1CAM synthesis inhibition using siRNA

Because L1CAM is considered to be a key factor in metastasis, it has been suggested that blocking this protein may inhibit cancer cells migration and tumor progression. Antibody therapy directed against L1CAM in mice models of cancer block tumor growth but enhance EMT. Liposome-encapsulated small interfering RNA has also proved to be an effective inhibitor for L1CAM expression as its function is to degrade a specific range of mRNA base pairs (in this case, the ones encoding for L1CAM sequence of amino acids) after transcription, so that the protein cannot be synthetised. Nevertheless, these possible therapies involving L1CAM as a target in human cancer are still in preclinical research.
