= Receptor tyrosine phosphatase =

Identifiers
- Symbol: Receptor tyrosine phosphatase
- Pfam: PF00102
- Membranome: 1
Available protein structures:
- PDB: PF00102 (ECOD; PDBsum)
- AlphaFold: PF00102

Receptor tyrosine phosphatases are enzyme-linked receptor phosphatases, a family of protein tyrosine phosphatases.

In humans, this family includes PTPRA, PTPRB, PTPRC, PTPRD, PTPRE, PTPRF, PTPRG, PTPRH, PTPRJ, PTPRK, PTPRM, PTPRN, PTPRN2, PTPRO, PTPRQ, PTPRR, PTPRS, PTPRT, PTPRU, and PTPRZ phosphatases.
