= PTPRA =

Protein-coding gene in the species Homo sapiens

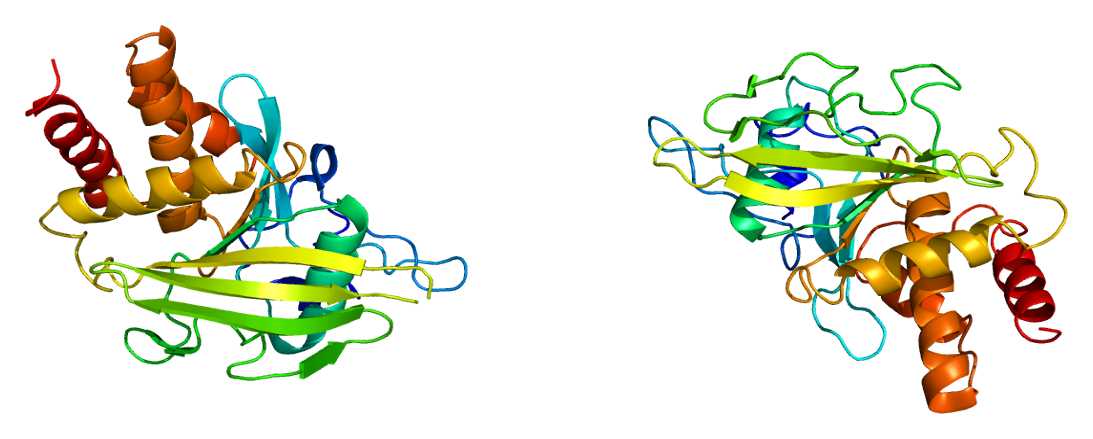

Identifiers
- Aliases: PTPRA, HEPTP, HLPR, HPTPA, HPTPalpha, LRP, PTPA, PTPRL2, R-PTP-alpha, RPTPA, protein tyrosine phosphatase, receptor type A, protein tyrosine phosphatase receptor type A
- External IDs: OMIM: 176884; MGI: 97808; GeneCards: PTPRA
Available structures
PDB	Ortholog search: PDBe RCSB
PDB	List of PDB id codes 1P15, 1YFO
Enzyme activity
EC #	BRENDA	ExPASy	KEGG	MetaCyc
3.1.3.48	↗	↗	↗	↗

Gene location (Human)
Chr.	Chromosome 20 (human)
Band	20p13	Start	2,864,184 bp
Band	20p13	End	3,039,076 bp

Gene location (Mouse)
Chr.	Chromosome 2 (mouse)
Band	2 F1|2 63.23 cM	Start	130,292,198 bp
Band	2 F1|2 63.23 cM	End	130,398,044 bp
RNA expression pattern
Bgee	Human / Mouse (ortholog); Top expressed in: Achilles tendon; ventricular zone; ganglionic eminence; right frontal lobe; prefrontal cortex; nucleus accumbens; right hemisphere of cerebellum; amygdala; cingulate gyrus; anterior cingulate cortex / Top expressed in: dentate gyrus of hippocampal formation granule cell; stroma of bone marrow; epithelium of lens; superior frontal gyrus; ventricular zone; subiculum; right kidney; primary visual cortex; cerebellar cortex; nucleus accumbens; More reference expression data
BioGPS	n/a
Gene ontology
Molecular function	protein binding; phosphatase activity; protein tyrosine phosphatase activity; phosphoprotein phosphatase activity; transmembrane receptor protein tyrosine phosphatase activity; hydrolase activity
Cellular component	receptor complex; integral component of plasma membrane; integral component of membrane; membrane; extracellular exosome; plasma membrane; intracellular anatomical structure; Schaffer collateral - CA1 synapse; integral component of synaptic membrane
Biological process	dephosphorylation; axon guidance; protein phosphorylation; protein dephosphorylation; MAPK cascade; peptidyl-tyrosine dephosphorylation; insulin receptor signaling pathway; regulation of molecular function; modulation of chemical synaptic transmission
Sources:Amigo / QuickGO
Orthologs
Databases	NCBI: entry; OMA: entry
Species	Human	Mouse
Entrez	5786	19262
Ensembl	ENSG00000132670	ENSMUSG00000027303
UniProt	P18433; Q5JWG0	P18052
RefSeq (mRNA)	NM_080841; NM_002836; NM_080840	NM_001163688; NM_008980; NM_001355161
RefSeq (protein)	NP_002827; NP_543030; NP_543031	NP_001157160; NP_033006; NP_001342090
Location (UCSC)	Chr 20: 2.86 – 3.04 Mb	Chr 2: 130.29 – 130.4 Mb
PubMed search
- Wikidata
View/Edit Human	View/Edit Mouse

Receptor-type tyrosine-protein phosphatase alpha is an enzyme that in humans is encoded by the PTPRA gene.

== Function ==
The protein encoded by this gene is a member of the receptor tyrosine phosphatases (RTP), a family of protein tyrosine phosphatases. RTPs are known to be signaling molecules that regulate a variety of cellular processes including cell growth, differentiation, mitotic cycle, and oncogenic transformation. This RTP contains an extracellular domain, a single transmembrane segment and two tandem intracytoplasmic catalytic domains, and thus represents a receptor-type RTP. This RTP has been shown to dephosphorylate and activate Src family tyrosine kinases, and is implicated in the regulation of integrin signaling, cell adhesion and proliferation. Three alternatively spliced variants of this gene, which encode two distinct isoforms, have been reported.

== Interactions ==
PTPRA has been shown to interact with Grb2 and KCNA2.
