= ADGRF5 =

Protein-coding gene found in humans

Identifiers
- Aliases: ADGRF5, KPG_001, GPR116, adhesion G protein-coupled receptor F5
- External IDs: MGI: 2182928; GeneCards: ADGRF5

Gene location (Human)
Chr.	Chromosome 6 (human)
Band	6p12.3	Start	46,852,522 bp
Band	6p12.3	End	46,954,943 bp

Gene location (Mouse)
Chr.	Chromosome 17 (mouse)
Band	17|17 B3	Start	43,671,342 bp
Band	17|17 B3	End	43,770,448 bp
RNA expression pattern
Bgee	Human / Mouse (ortholog); Top expressed in: lower lobe of lung; visceral pleura; right lung; upper lobe of lung; upper lobe of left lung; renal medulla; right ventricle; metanephric glomerulus; vena cava; pericardium / Top expressed in: right lung; right lung lobe; left lung lobe; endothelial cell of lymphatic vessel; interventricular septum; myocardium of ventricle; extraocular muscle; digastric muscle; soleus muscle; brown adipose tissue; More reference expression data
BioGPS	n/a
Gene ontology
Molecular function	G protein-coupled receptor activity; transmembrane signaling receptor activity; signal transducer activity
Cellular component	integral component of membrane; cell surface; plasma membrane; apical part of cell; cytoplasmic vesicle; membrane
Biological process	surfactant homeostasis; negative regulation of macrophage activation; G protein-coupled receptor signaling pathway; cell surface receptor signaling pathway; energy reserve metabolic process; regulation of lipid metabolic process; fat cell differentiation; positive regulation of phospholipid biosynthetic process; glucose homeostasis; signal transduction; glomerular filtration; erythrocyte development; pharyngeal arch artery morphogenesis
Sources:Amigo / QuickGO
Orthologs
Databases	NCBI: entry; OMA: entry
Species	Human	Mouse
Entrez	221395	224792
Ensembl	ENSG00000069122	ENSMUSG00000056492
UniProt	Q8IZF2	G5E8Q8
RefSeq (mRNA)	NM_001098518; NM_015234	NM_001081178; NM_001357332
RefSeq (protein)	NP_001091988; NP_056049	NP_001074647; NP_001344261; NP_001391458; NP_001391459; NP_001391465 NP_001391470; NP_001391475; NP_001391477
Location (UCSC)	Chr 6: 46.85 – 46.95 Mb	Chr 17: 43.67 – 43.77 Mb
PubMed search
- Wikidata
View/Edit Human	View/Edit Mouse

Adhesion G protein-coupled receptor F5 is a protein that in humans is encoded by the ADGRF5 gene (previously GPR116). ADGRF5 has now been shown to play an essential role in the regulation of lung surfactant homeostasis. It functions as a receptor for soluble FNDC4, an anti-inflammatory protein that is also involved in systematic glucose tolerance.
