= LRFN4 =

Protein-coding gene in humans

Identifiers
- Aliases: LRFN4, FIGLER6, SALM3, SALM3., leucine rich repeat and fibronectin type III domain containing 4
- External IDs: OMIM: 612810; MGI: 2385612; GeneCards: LRFN4

Gene location (Human)
| Chr. | Chromosome 11 (human) |
| Band | 11q13.2 | Start | 66,856,647 bp |
| Band | 11q13.2 | End | 66,860,475 bp |

Gene location (Mouse)
| Chr. | Chromosome 19 (mouse) |
| Band | 19|19 A | Start | 4,661,813 bp |
| Band | 19|19 A | End | 4,665,695 bp |
RNA expression pattern
| Bgee | Human / Mouse (ortholog); Top expressed in: ganglionic eminence; right hemisphere of cerebellum; mucosa of transverse colon; apex of heart; right frontal lobe; anterior cingulate cortex; right uterine tube; stromal cell of endometrium; decidua; amygdala / Top expressed in: ventricular zone; epiblast; hand; ganglionic eminence; yolk sac; superior frontal gyrus; primary visual cortex; external carotid artery; dentate gyrus of hippocampal formation granule cell; internal carotid artery; More reference expression data |
| BioGPS | n/a |
Gene ontology
| Molecular function | protein binding |
| Cellular component | cell surface; membrane; integral component of membrane; plasma membrane; extracellular space; glutamatergic synapse; GABA-ergic synapse; integral component of postsynaptic density membrane |
| Biological process | axonogenesis; regulation of postsynaptic density assembly; synaptic membrane adhesion; regulation of presynapse assembly |
Sources:Amigo / QuickGO
Orthologs
| Databases | NCBI: entry; OMA: entry |
| Species | Human | Mouse |
| Entrez | 78999 | 225875 |
| Ensembl | ENSG00000173621 | ENSMUSG00000045045 |
| UniProt | Q6PJG9 | Q80XU8 |
| RefSeq (mRNA) | NM_024036; NM_001363524 | NM_153388 |
| RefSeq (protein) | NP_076941; NP_001350453; NP_076941.2 | NP_700437 |
| Location (UCSC) | Chr 11: 66.86 – 66.86 Mb | Chr 19: 4.66 – 4.67 Mb |
| PubMed search |
- Wikidata
| View/Edit Human | View/Edit Mouse |

Leucine rich repeat and fibronectin type III domain containing 4 is a protein that in humans is encoded by the LRFN4 gene. This protein is predicted to stimulate additional axon/dendrite out-growth in neurons in the hippocampus.

== See also ==
- Fibronectin type III domain
- Leucine rich repeat
