= PTPRZ1 =

Protein-coding gene in humans

Identifiers
- Aliases: PTPRZ1, HPTPZ, HPTPzeta, PTP-ZETA, PTP18, PTPRZ, PTPZ, R-PTP-zeta-2, RPTPB, RPTPbeta, phosphacan, protein tyrosine phosphatase, receptor type Z1, protein tyrosine phosphatase receptor type Z1
- External IDs: OMIM: 176891; MGI: 97816; GeneCards: PTPRZ1
Available structures
PDB	Ortholog search: PDBe RCSB
PDB	List of PDB id codes 3JXF, 3S97, 5AWX
Enzyme activity
EC #	BRENDA	ExPASy	KEGG	MetaCyc
3.1.3.48	↗	↗	↗	↗

Gene location (Human)
Chr.	Chromosome 7 (human)
Band	7q31.32	Start	121,873,089 bp
Band	7q31.32	End	122,062,036 bp

Gene location (Mouse)
Chr.	Chromosome 6 (mouse)
Band	6|6 A3.1	Start	22,875,501 bp
Band	6|6 A3.1	End	23,052,915 bp
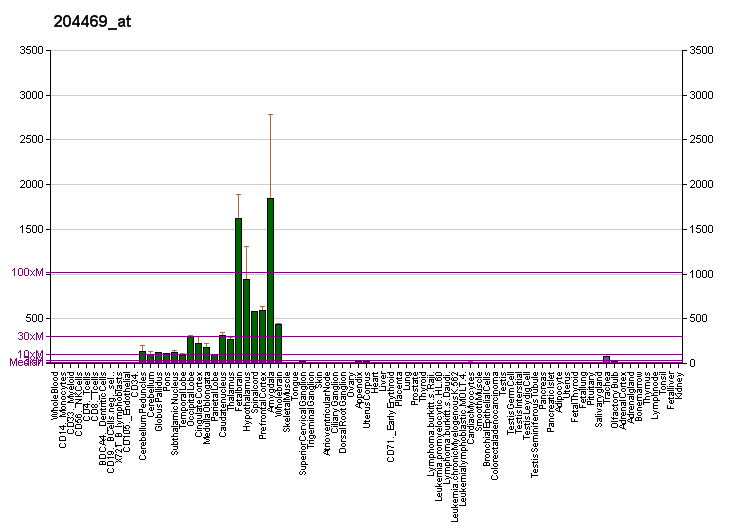
RNA expression pattern
Bgee	Human / Mouse (ortholog); Top expressed in: ventricular zone; ganglionic eminence; endothelial cell; amygdala; Region I of hippocampus proper; optic nerve; caudate nucleus; nucleus accumbens; corpus callosum; external globus pallidus / Top expressed in: vestibular membrane of cochlear duct; Rostral migratory stream; mammillary body; median eminence; ventromedial nucleus; lobe of cerebellum; arcuate nucleus; cerebellar vermis; lateral septal nucleus; anterior amygdaloid area; More reference expression data
BioGPS	More reference expression data
Gene ontology
Molecular function	phosphoprotein phosphatase activity; phosphatase activity; protein binding; protein tyrosine phosphatase activity; transmembrane receptor protein tyrosine phosphatase activity; hydrolase activity; integrin binding
Cellular component	integral component of membrane; membrane; integral component of plasma membrane; extracellular region; perineuronal net; intrinsic component of plasma membrane; plasma membrane; extracellular matrix; synapse
Biological process	axonogenesis; protein dephosphorylation; oligodendrocyte differentiation; regulation of oligodendrocyte progenitor proliferation; central nervous system development; hematopoietic progenitor cell differentiation; learning or memory; peptidyl-tyrosine dephosphorylation; dephosphorylation; cytokine-mediated signaling pathway; regulation of myelination; negative regulation of neuron apoptotic process; positive regulation of oligodendrocyte differentiation
Sources:Amigo / QuickGO
Orthologs
Databases	NCBI: entry; OMA: entry
Species	Human	Mouse
Entrez	5803	19283
Ensembl	ENSG00000106278	ENSMUSG00000068748
UniProt	P23471	B9EKR1
RefSeq (mRNA)	NM_001206838; NM_001206839; NM_002851; NM_001369395; NM_001369396	NM_001081306; NM_011219; NM_178180; NM_001311064; NM_001361349
RefSeq (protein)	NP_001193767; NP_001193768; NP_002842	NP_001074775; NP_001297993; NP_001348278; NP_035349; NP_001389981 NP_001389982; NP_001389983
Location (UCSC)	Chr 7: 121.87 – 122.06 Mb	Chr 6: 22.88 – 23.05 Mb
PubMed search
- Wikidata
View/Edit Human	View/Edit Mouse

Receptor-type tyrosine-protein phosphatase zeta also known as phosphacan is an enzyme that in humans is encoded by the PTPRZ1 gene (previously PTPRZ).

== Function ==
This gene is a member of the receptor tyrosine phosphatase family and encodes a single-pass type I membrane protein with two cytoplasmic tyrosine-protein phosphatase domains, an alpha-carbonic anhydrase domain and a fibronectin type III domain. Alternative splice variants that encode different protein isoforms have been described but their full-length nature has not been determined.

== Clinical significance ==
Expression of this gene is induced in gastric cancer cells, in the remyelinating oligodendrocytes of multiple sclerosis lesions, and in human embryonic kidney cells under hypoxic conditions. Both the protein and transcript are overexpressed in glioblastoma cells, promoting their haptotactic migration.
