= PHYHIP =

Protein-coding gene in the species Homo sapiens

Identifiers
- Aliases: PHYHIP, DYRK1AP3, PAHX-AP, PAHXAP1, phytanoyl-CoA 2-hydroxylase interacting protein
- External IDs: OMIM: 608511; MGI: 1860417; HomoloGene: 8847; GeneCards: PHYHIP; OMA:PHYHIP - orthologs

Gene location (Human)
Chr.	Chromosome 8 (human)
Band	8p21.3	Start	22,219,703 bp
Band	8p21.3	End	22,232,101 bp

Gene location (Mouse)
Chr.	Chromosome 14 (mouse)
Band	14|14 D2	Start	70,694,916 bp
Band	14|14 D2	End	70,706,272 bp
RNA expression pattern
Bgee	Human / Mouse (ortholog); Top expressed in: right hemisphere of cerebellum; middle frontal gyrus; Brodmann area 10; paraflocculus of cerebellum; right frontal lobe; Brodmann area 9; nucleus accumbens; putamen; caudate nucleus; frontal pole / Top expressed in: dentate gyrus of hippocampal formation granule cell; superior frontal gyrus; cerebellar cortex; primary visual cortex; cerebellar vermis; lobe of cerebellum; olfactory tubercle; piriform cortex; prefrontal cortex; subiculum; More reference expression data
BioGPS	n/a
Gene ontology
Molecular function	protein tyrosine kinase binding
Cellular component	cytoplasm
Biological process	xenophagy; positive regulation of defense response to virus by host; protein localization
Sources:Amigo / QuickGO
Orthologs
Species	Human	Mouse
Entrez	9796	105653
Ensembl	ENSG00000168490	ENSMUSG00000003469
UniProt	Q92561	Q8K0S0
RefSeq (mRNA)	NM_001099335; NM_014759; NM_001363311; NM_001363312	NM_145981
RefSeq (protein)	NP_001092805; NP_055574; NP_001350240; NP_001350241	NP_666093
Location (UCSC)	Chr 8: 22.22 – 22.23 Mb	Chr 14: 70.69 – 70.71 Mb
PubMed search
- Wikidata
View/Edit Human	View/Edit Mouse

Phytanoyl-CoA 2-hydroxylase interacting protein is a protein that in humans is encoded by the PHYHIP gene.
