= Astrotactin-1 =

Glycoprotein in humans

ASTN1

Identifiers
- Aliases: ASTN1, ASTN, astrotactin 1
- External IDs: OMIM: 600904; MGI: 1098567; GeneCards: ASTN1

Gene location (Human)
Chr.	Chromosome 1 (human)
Band	1q25.2	Start	176,857,302 bp
Band	1q25.2	End	177,164,973 bp

Gene location (Mouse)
Chr.	Chromosome 1 (mouse)
Band	1|1 H1	Start	158,362,273 bp
Band	1|1 H1	End	158,691,781 bp
RNA expression pattern
Bgee	Human / Mouse (ortholog); Top expressed in: postcentral gyrus; entorhinal cortex; superior frontal gyrus; middle temporal gyrus; orbitofrontal cortex; Brodmann area 46; prefrontal cortex; ventricular zone; dorsolateral prefrontal cortex; Brodmann area 23 / Top expressed in: subiculum; paraventricular nucleus of hypothalamus; arcuate nucleus; anterior amygdaloid area; dorsomedial hypothalamic nucleus; cingulate gyrus; supraoptic nucleus; median eminence; ventromedial nucleus; dorsal tegmental nucleus; More reference expression data
BioGPS	n/a
Orthologs
Databases	NCBI: entry; OMA: entry
Species	Human	Mouse
Entrez	460	11899
Ensembl	ENSG00000152092	ENSMUSG00000026587
UniProt	O14525	Q61137
RefSeq (mRNA)	NM_001286164; NM_004319; NM_207108; NM_001364856	NM_001205204; NM_007495
RefSeq (protein)	NP_001273093; NP_004310; NP_996991; NP_001351785	NP_001192133; NP_031521
Location (UCSC)	Chr 1: 176.86 – 177.16 Mb	Chr 1: 158.36 – 158.69 Mb
PubMed search
- Wikidata
View/Edit Human	View/Edit Mouse

Astrotactin-1 (ASTN1), sometimes just called astrotactin, is a protein that in humans is encoded by the gene ASTN1. It is a glycoprotein expressed primarily in the central nervous system. ASTN1 and its homolog, astrotactin-2, are involved in regulation of adhesion during the radial migration of neurons in the developing CNS. Astrotactin-1 is a neuronal adhesion molecule required for glial-guided migration of young postmitotic neuroblasts with expression is primarily located in the cells of cortical regions of the developing brain including; cerebrum, hippocampus, cerebellum, and olfactory bulb.

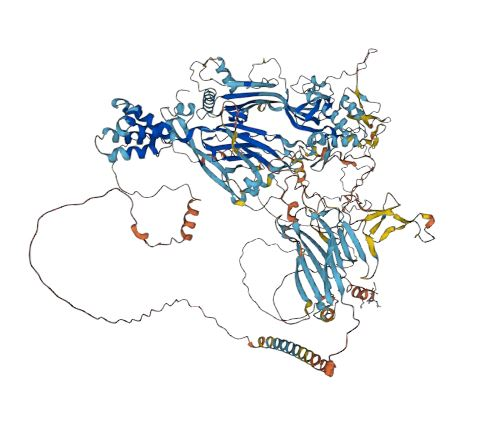
Astrotactin-3D-model

== Biochemical properties ==
ASTN-1 is created via developmental pathways via mRNA, the astrotactin-1 protein is generated from Chromosome 1: 176,861,067-177,164,712 and the Gencode Gene: ENSG00000152092.16 with a base pair size of 303,646 and total Exon count of 23. Composed of 1294 amino acids on average with some variations of 1302, 1228, and 1216 depending on an individual's genetic composition. Astrotactin-1 appears highly conserved as mutations are quite rare with 2 deletions and a single duplication recorded within a sample of 64,114 subjects. ASTN1 features a relatively short amino terminus coupled with a longer carboxyl terminus within the extracellular matrix of their environment that may aid in the protein function of movement.

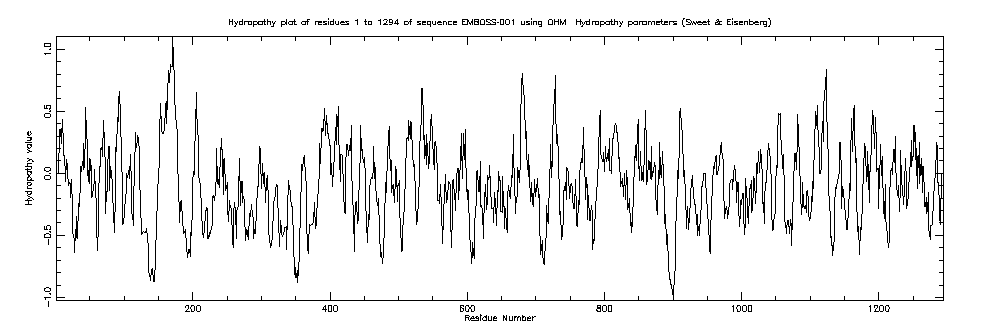
Hydropathy Plot for ASTN-1

Considered a Multi-pass membrane protein responsible for the neuronal migrations in cortical regions of the brain are guided by a system of radial glial fibers. This process begins via gene signaling during fetal development and lasts until brain maturation around the age of 26.

== Neural action ==
Gord Fishell and Mary E. Hatten in 1991 used in vitro assays to determine the role Astrotactin-1 plays in the neuronal migration of granule neurons. This mechanism of action appears to be ASTN1 providing the neural receptor for migration in astro-gial membranes via its transmembrane regions to intersect glial membranes.

Using phase-contrast microscopy the average speed and frequency of migration of individual cells could be used to quantify the movement of large populations of neurons along the glial fibers. One experiment showed that over a three-hour observation period, approximately eighty percent of the cells moved more than 15 pm along a single glial fiber. Additionally, migrating cells expressed regular and characteristic form, creating a tight apposition with the astro-glial fiber matrix and extending a leading process of cells in the direction of movement. During migration, saltatory contraction and extension of the neural soma along the glial fiber appeared to provide forward motion. The total distance moved by the individual cells over a 5h period were as much as 210 μm, with rapidly migrating cells generally moving those longer distances. Distance is not a total measurement but only the positive value given for forward mobility. Neurons would often briefly reverse their migrating direction, reaching the end of a glial fiber before reversing, along with some pauses between start and end of glia fibers.

Further, via the addition of anti-astrotactin antibodies caused migrating neurons to detach from the glial fibers within three hours of the antibody addition to said cultures. Conversely, while anti-astrotactin antibodies blocked glial guided neuronal migration, neurons stayed bound to the radial astrotactin-1 supported glial fibers for the entire three hour assay period.

Unlike other mechanisms of CNS neuron movement which use the formation of an interstitial junction. The neural protein astrotactin contributes to the establishment of adhesion sites along the leading process, the formation of brand new interstitial junctions and neural cytoskeletal organization as the neuron moves along the astrotactin glial guide.

Wnt signal transduction may play a part in alleviating the effect of ASTN1 on migration and invasion of neural cells. ASTN1-silenced cells were treated to inhibit the Wnt signal transduction pathway; significantly increased migration and invasion of cells, whereas control treatment suppressed these effects. These results further verify the role of the Wnt signaling pathway in the effects of ASTN1 on migration and invasion.

== Connection to diseases ==
Down regulation of ASTN1 is linked to both central nervous system diseases as well as other tissue disorders such as various cancers. Further connections have been made to the possible connection of neurodevelopmental and neurodegenerative diseases to ASTN1. While ASTN2 has a high correlation to various neurodevelopmental disorders such as: ASDs, ADHD, speech delays, general anxiety, and obsessive compulsive disorder ASTN1 appears to be less mutated and impactful to these disorders.

Hepatocellular carcinoma, HCC, has some connection to decreased ASTN1 levels. Within HCC tissues ASTN1 is downregulated compared to controls, with lower levels of ASTN1 mRNA expression in tumor tissues. Further, lower levels of ASTN1 are associated with more advanced clinical stages of hepatocellular carcinoma. More generally decreased levels of ASTN1 in tissues are associated with cancer along with; presence of microscopic satellite nodules, vascular invasion, tumor size, encapsulation, and Tumor-Node-Metastasis stage.

ASTN1 downregulates several downstream genes of the Wnt/β-catenin signal transduction pathway, which is excessively activated in human liver cancer tissues. The results suggest that ASTN1 may function via the Wnt/β-catenin signal transduction pathway and could potentially serve as a tumor-suppressor gene in liver cancer.

Interestingly, as many of the genes are mutated in both early and late stage tumors, ASTN1 mutations are present in stages II–IV tumors but not in stage I tumors. This suggests that ASTN1 plays a role in tumor progression rather than tumor initiation in small cell lung cancers. ASTN1 mutations seemingly play a role across tumor stages II to IV and not in stage I possibly indicating ASTN1 role as a tumor progressor in some cancer such as lung.

Potential connections between ASTN1 and Ritscher-Schinzel Syndrome 1, an autosomal recessive disease featuring developmental malformations characterized by craniofacial abnormalities, heart defects, and brain malformations within the cerebellum are some of the more current avenues of study.

ASTN2 expression has been linked to higher survival rates for female lung cancer patients.

== Intramembrane cleavage potential ==
Familial proteins Astn1 and Astn2 found in mouse cells were observed to feature intramembrane cleavage. Confirmed by the joining of one or more disulfide bonds within the second transmembrane region via cysteine-to-serine mutagenesis. Cleavage for the ASTN1 protein is undetermined as a determinant cleavage site is yet to be reported.
