= CRLF3 =

Protein-coding gene in the species Homo sapiens

Identifiers
- Aliases: CRLF3, CREME-9, CREME9, CRLM9, CYTOR4, FRWS, p48.2, cytokine receptor like factor 3
- External IDs: OMIM: 614853; MGI: 1860086; GeneCards: CRLF3

Gene location (Human)
| Chr. | Chromosome 17 (human) |
| Band | 17q11.2 | Start | 30,769,388 bp |
| Band | 17q11.2 | End | 30,824,692 bp |

Gene location (Mouse)
| Chr. | Chromosome 11 (mouse) |
| Band | 11 B5|11 47.43 cM | Start | 79,937,319 bp |
| Band | 11 B5|11 47.43 cM | End | 79,971,817 bp |
RNA expression pattern
| Bgee | Human / Mouse (ortholog); Top expressed in: trabecular bone; mononuclear cell; monocyte; bone marrow; blood; lymph node; epithelium of nasopharynx; thymus; bone marrow cell; mucosa of sigmoid colon / Top expressed in: neural layer of retina; granulocyte; spleen; blood; mesenteric lymph nodes; thymus; tibiofemoral joint; fetal liver hematopoietic progenitor cell; bone marrow; right lung lobe; More reference expression data |
| BioGPS | n/a |
Gene ontology
| Molecular function | protein binding; identical protein binding; DNA binding |
| Cellular component | plasma membrane; cytoplasm; cytosol; nucleus |
| Biological process | negative regulation of cell growth; positive regulation of transcription, DNA-templated; positive regulation of transcription by RNA polymerase II; positive regulation of receptor signaling pathway via JAK-STAT; G1/S transition of mitotic cell cycle |
Sources:Amigo / QuickGO
Orthologs
| Databases | NCBI: entry; OMA: entry |
| Species | Human | Mouse |
| Entrez | 51379 | 54394 |
| Ensembl | ENSG00000176390 | ENSMUSG00000017561 |
| UniProt | Q8IUI8 | Q9Z2L7 |
| RefSeq (mRNA) | NM_015986 | NM_001277106; NM_018776 |
| RefSeq (protein) | NP_057070 | NP_001264035; NP_061246 |
| Location (UCSC) | Chr 17: 30.77 – 30.82 Mb | Chr 11: 79.94 – 79.97 Mb |
| PubMed search |
- Wikidata
| View/Edit Human | View/Edit Mouse |

Cytokine receptor-like factor 3 is a protein that in humans is encoded by the CRLF3 gene.

== Function ==
Although CRLF3 signaling pathways have not yet been fully characterized it is very likely that CRLF3 is a neuroprotective erythropoietin receptor.

== Origin ==
Phylogenetic analyses have shown that CRLF3 at first appeared in a common ancestor of Cnidaria and Bilateria and hence emerged with the origin of the nervous system.
