= PHYHIPL =

Protein-coding gene in the species Homo sapiens

Identifiers
- Aliases: PHYHIPL, phytanoyl-CoA 2-hydroxylase interacting protein like
- External IDs: MGI: 1918161; GeneCards: PHYHIPL

Gene location (Human)
Chr.	Chromosome 10 (human)
Band	10q21.1	Start	59,176,643 bp
Band	10q21.1	End	59,247,774 bp

Gene location (Mouse)
Chr.	Chromosome 10 (mouse)
Band	10|10 B5.3	Start	70,393,512 bp
Band	10|10 B5.3	End	70,491,795 bp
RNA expression pattern
Bgee	Human / Mouse (ortholog); Top expressed in: prefrontal cortex; postcentral gyrus; Brodmann area 9; hypothalamus; substantia nigra; internal globus pallidus; superior vestibular nucleus; pars compacta; corpus callosum; superior frontal gyrus / Top expressed in: spermatid; lateral hypothalamus; paraventricular nucleus of hypothalamus; medial vestibular nucleus; dorsal tegmental nucleus; ventral tegmental area; mammillary body; seminiferous tubule; deep cerebellar nuclei; dorsomedial hypothalamic nucleus; More reference expression data
BioGPS	n/a
Orthologs
Databases	NCBI: entry; OMA: entry
Species	Human	Mouse
Entrez	84457	70911
Ensembl	ENSG00000165443	ENSMUSG00000037747
UniProt	Q96FC7	Q8BGT8
RefSeq (mRNA)	NM_001143774; NM_032439	NM_001162846; NM_178621
RefSeq (protein)	NP_001137246; NP_115815	NP_001156318; NP_848736
Location (UCSC)	Chr 10: 59.18 – 59.25 Mb	Chr 10: 70.39 – 70.49 Mb
PubMed search
- Wikidata
View/Edit Human	View/Edit Mouse

Phytanoyl-CoA hydroxylase-interacting protein-like is an enzyme that in humans is encoded by the PHYHIPL gene.
