= SPEG =

Protein-coding gene in the species Homo sapiens

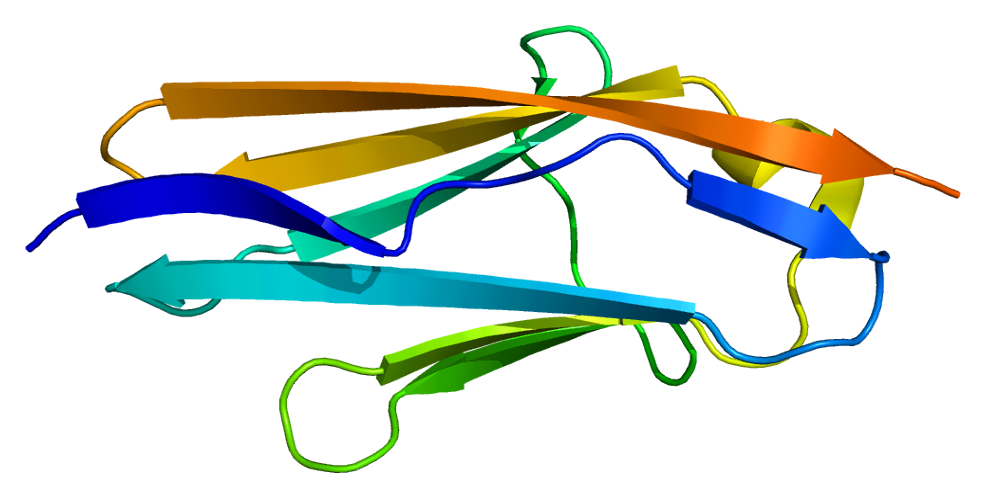

Identifiers
- Aliases: SPEG, APEG-1, APEG1, BPEG, SPEGalpha, SPEGbeta, CNM5, SPEG complex locus, MYLK6, striated muscle enriched protein kinase
- External IDs: OMIM: 615950; MGI: 109282; GeneCards: SPEG
Available structures
| PDB | Ortholog search: PDBe RCSB |
| PDB | List of PDB id codes 1U2H |
Enzyme activity
| EC # | BRENDA | ExPASy | KEGG | MetaCyc |
|---|---|---|---|---|
| 2.7.11.1 | ↗ | ↗ | ↗ | ↗ |

Gene location (Human)
| Chr. | Chromosome 2 (human) |
| Band | 2q35 | Start | 219,434,843 bp |
| Band | 2q35 | End | 219,493,629 bp |

Gene location (Mouse)
| Chr. | Chromosome 1 (mouse) |
| Band | 1 C4|1 38.88 cM | Start | 75,375,297 bp |
| Band | 1 C4|1 38.88 cM | End | 75,432,320 bp |
RNA expression pattern
| Bgee | Human / Mouse (ortholog); Top expressed in: popliteal artery; tibial arteries; right coronary artery; Descending thoracic aorta; ascending aorta; gastric mucosa; body of uterus; left uterine tube; muscle layer of sigmoid colon; left coronary artery / Top expressed in: ascending aorta; aortic valve; external carotid artery; internal carotid artery; tunica media of zone of aorta; muscle of thigh; Epithelium of choroid plexus; right ventricle; triceps brachii muscle; superior surface of tongue; More reference expression data |
| BioGPS | n/a |
Gene ontology
| Molecular function | transferase activity; nucleotide binding; protein serine/threonine kinase activity; protein kinase activity; protein binding; ATP binding; kinase activity |
| Cellular component | nucleus |
| Biological process | protein phosphorylation; muscle cell differentiation; muscle organ development; cell differentiation; phosphorylation; negative regulation of cell population proliferation |
Sources:Amigo / QuickGO
Orthologs
| Databases | NCBI: entry; OMA: entry |
| Species | Human | Mouse |
| Entrez | 10290 | 11790 |
| Ensembl | ENSG00000072195 | ENSMUSG00000026207 |
| UniProt | Q15772 | Q62407 |
| RefSeq (mRNA) | NM_001173476; NM_005876 | NM_001085370; NM_001085371; NM_001173477; NM_007463 |
| RefSeq (protein) | NP_001166947; NP_005867 | NP_001078839; NP_001078840; NP_001166948; NP_031489 |
| Location (UCSC) | Chr 2: 219.43 – 219.49 Mb | Chr 1: 75.38 – 75.43 Mb |
| PubMed search |
- Wikidata
| View/Edit Human | View/Edit Mouse |

Striated muscle preferentially expressed protein kinase, in the human is encoded by the SPEG gene, a member of the myosin light-chain kinase protein family. SPEG is involved in the development of the muscle cell cytoskeleton, and the expression of this gene has important roles in the development of skeletal muscles, and their maintenance and function. Mutations are associated with centronuclear myopathies a group of congenital disorders where the cell nuclei are abnormally centrally placed.

In the mouse this gene is called SPEG complex locus. Expression of this gene is thought to serve as a marker for differentiated vascular smooth muscle cells which may have a role in regulating growth and differentiation of this cell type. The encoded protein is highly similar to the corresponding rat and mouse proteins. Multiple alternatively spliced transcript variants have been found for this gene, but the full-length nature of only one variant has been defined.

Mouse Mutant Alleles for Speg
| Marker Symbol for Mouse Gene. This symbol is assigned to the genomic locus by the MGI | Speg |
| Mutant Mouse Embryonic Stem Cell Clones. These are the known targeted mutations for this gene in a mouse. | Speg^{tm1a(KOMP)Wtsi} |
Example structure of targeted conditional mutant allele for this gene
Molecular structure of Speg region with inserted mutation sequence
These Mutant ES Cells can be studied directly or used to generate mice with this gene knocked out. Study of these mice can shed light on the function of Speg: see Knockout mouse
