= SDK2 =

Protein-coding gene in the species Homo sapiens

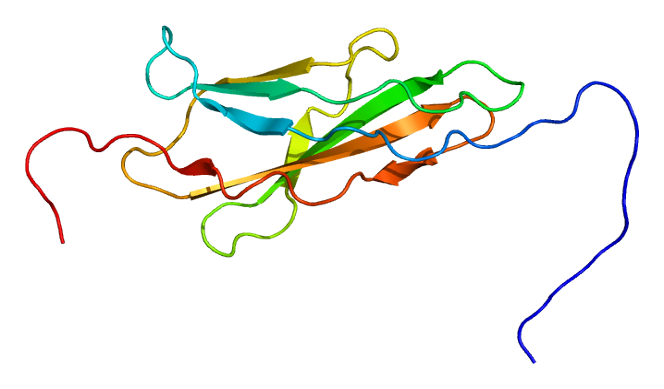

Identifiers
- Aliases: SDK2, sidekick cell adhesion molecule 2
- External IDs: OMIM: 607217; MGI: 2443847; GeneCards: SDK2
Available structures
PDB	Ortholog search: PDBe RCSB
PDB	List of PDB id codes 1WF5, 1WFN, 1WFO, 1WIS

Gene location (Human)
Chr.	Chromosome 17 (human)
Band	17q25.1	Start	73,334,384 bp
Band	17q25.1	End	73,644,445 bp

Gene location (Mouse)
Chr.	Chromosome 11 (mouse)
Band	11|11 E2	Start	113,667,200 bp
Band	11|11 E2	End	113,957,872 bp
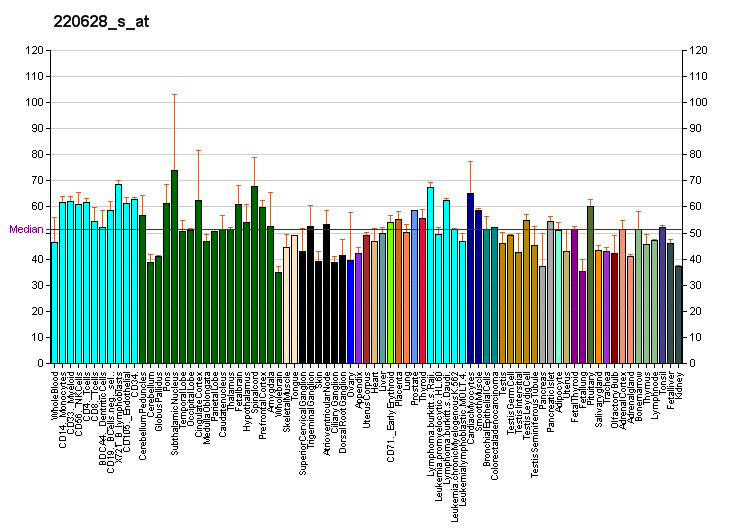

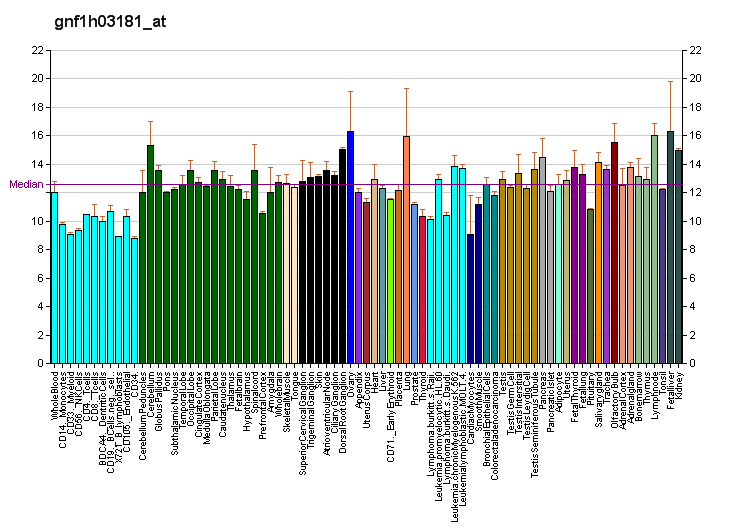
RNA expression pattern
Bgee	Human / Mouse (ortholog); Top expressed in: cartilage tissue; tibia; tendon of biceps brachii; germinal epithelium; caput epididymis; buccal mucosa cell; retinal pigment epithelium; mucosa of paranasal sinus; entorhinal cortex; lactiferous duct / Top expressed in: calvaria; Rostral migratory stream; sciatic nerve; ciliary body; medial dorsal nucleus; prefrontal cortex; fossa; condyle; molar; arcuate nucleus; More reference expression data
BioGPS	More reference expression data
Orthologs
Databases	NCBI: entry; OMA: entry
Species	Human	Mouse
Entrez	54549	237979
Ensembl	ENSG00000069188	ENSMUSG00000041592
UniProt	Q58EX2	Q6V4S5
RefSeq (mRNA)	NM_001144952; NM_019064	NM_172800
RefSeq (protein)	NP_001138424	NP_766388
Location (UCSC)	Chr 17: 73.33 – 73.64 Mb	Chr 11: 113.67 – 113.96 Mb
PubMed search
- Wikidata
View/Edit Human	View/Edit Mouse

Protein sidekick-2 is a protein that in humans is encoded by the SDK2 gene.

== Function ==
The protein encoded by this gene is a member of the immunoglobulin superfamily. The protein contains two immunoglobulin domains and thirteen fibronectin type III domains. Fibronectin type III domains are present in both extracellular and intracellular proteins and tandem repeats are known to contain binding sites for DNA, heparin and the cell surface. This protein, and a homologous mouse sequence, are very similar to the Drosophila sidekick gene product but the specific function of this superfamily member is not yet known. Evidence for alternative splicing at this gene locus has been observed but the full-length nature of additional variants has not yet been determined.
