= SDK1 =

Protein-coding gene in humans

Identifiers
- Aliases: SDK1, sidekick cell adhesion molecule 1
- External IDs: OMIM: 607216; MGI: 2444413; GeneCards: SDK1

Gene location (Human)
Chr.	Chromosome 7 (human)
Band	7p22.2	Start	3,301,252 bp
Band	7p22.2	End	4,269,000 bp

Gene location (Mouse)
Chr.	Chromosome 5 (mouse)
Band	5|5 G2	Start	141,227,245 bp
Band	5|5 G2	End	142,201,341 bp
RNA expression pattern
Bgee	Human / Mouse (ortholog); Top expressed in: popliteal artery; decidua; tibial arteries; body of pancreas; sural nerve; islet of Langerhans; olfactory zone of nasal mucosa; gonad; Descending thoracic aorta; ascending aorta / Top expressed in: otolith organ; utricle; Jacobson's organ; gastrula; internal carotid artery; genital tubercle; lens; external carotid artery; zygote; sciatic nerve; More reference expression data
BioGPS	n/a
Gene ontology
Molecular function	identical protein binding
Cellular component	integral component of membrane; cell junction; synapse; membrane; plasma membrane
Biological process	synapse assembly; cell adhesion; retina layer formation; regulation of dendritic spine development; behavioral response to cocaine; homophilic cell adhesion via plasma membrane adhesion molecules; cell-cell junction organization
Sources:Amigo / QuickGO
Orthologs
Databases	NCBI: entry; OMA: entry
Species	Human	Mouse
Entrez	221935	330222
Ensembl	ENSG00000146555	ENSMUSG00000039683
UniProt	Q7Z5N4	Q3UH53
RefSeq (mRNA)	NM_001079653; NM_152744	NM_177879
RefSeq (protein)	NP_001073121; NP_689957	NP_808547
Location (UCSC)	Chr 7: 3.3 – 4.27 Mb	Chr 5: 141.23 – 142.2 Mb
PubMed search
- Wikidata
View/Edit Human	View/Edit Mouse

Protein sidekick-1 is a protein that in humans is encoded by the gene SDK1.

== Function ==
The protein encoded by this gene is a member of the immunoglobulin superfamily. The protein contains six immunoglobulin-like domains and thirteen fibronectin type III domains. Fibronectin type III domains are present in both extracellular and intracellular proteins and tandem repeats are known to contain binding sites for DNA, heparin and the cell surface. Alternative splicing results in multiple transcript variants. [provided by RefSeq, Jul 2016].
