= FNDC4 =

Protein-coding gene found in humans

Identifiers
- Aliases: FNDC4, FRCP1, fibronectin type III domain containing 4
- External IDs: OMIM: 611905; MGI: 1917195; GeneCards: FNDC4

Gene location (Human)
Chr.	Chromosome 2 (human)
Band	2p23.3	Start	27,491,883 bp
Band	2p23.3	End	27,495,200 bp

Gene location (Mouse)
Chr.	Chromosome 5 (mouse)
Band	5|5 B1	Start	31,449,586 bp
Band	5|5 B1	End	31,453,424 bp
RNA expression pattern
Bgee	Human / Mouse (ortholog); Top expressed in: left adrenal cortex; right adrenal gland; right adrenal cortex; right lobe of liver; right frontal lobe; anterior cingulate cortex; prefrontal cortex; Brodmann area 9; nucleus accumbens; caudate nucleus / Top expressed in: motor neuron; dentate gyrus of hippocampal formation granule cell; neural layer of retina; medial dorsal nucleus; internal carotid artery; external carotid artery; facial motor nucleus; cerebellar cortex; superior frontal gyrus; lateral geniculate nucleus; More reference expression data
BioGPS	n/a
Orthologs
Databases	NCBI: entry; OMA: entry
Species	Human	Mouse
Entrez	64838	64339
Ensembl	ENSG00000115226	ENSMUSG00000038552
UniProt	Q9H6D8	Q3TR08
RefSeq (mRNA)	NM_022823	NM_022424; NM_001356945; NM_001356946; NM_001378890
RefSeq (protein)	NP_073734	NP_071869; NP_001343874; NP_001343875; NP_001365819
Location (UCSC)	Chr 2: 27.49 – 27.5 Mb	Chr 5: 31.45 – 31.45 Mb
PubMed search
- Wikidata
View/Edit Human	View/Edit Mouse

Fibronectin type III domain-containing protein 4 is a protein that in humans is encoded by the FNDC4 gene. This protein is cleaved into a smaller, secreted protein, soluble FNDC4 (sFNDC4) which activates the receptor ADGRF5 (previously called GPR116), triggering anti-inflammatory effects.

== Function ==
The (long form) of the FNDC4 protein is a single-pass membrane protein, but it can also be cleaved into a secreted, soluble form: sFNDC4. FNDC4 is expressed most highly in the liver and brain, with the liver likely being the main source of sFNDC4 in the body. sFNDC4 signals to various cells and tissues. In the colon, it inhibits inflammatory macrophage activity. In bones, it appears to inhibit the differentiation of osteoclasts, which reduces the amount of bone that the body breaks down.

FNDC4 is also expressed by adipose tissue, functioning as an adipokine. In addition to local anti-inflammatory effects, sFNDC4 has been found to stimulate adipose tissue browning in human fat cells, This effect is mediated by its activation of the ADGRF5 receptor in white fat cells. Based on studies in mice, it is also predicted to increase the insulin sensitivity of fat cells.

== Alternative names ==
FNDC4 has also been called Fibronectin type III repeat-containing protein 1 (FRCP1).

== See also ==
- FNDC5
