= MYBPH =

Myosin Binding Protein H (MYBPH)

Identifiers
- Aliases: MYBPH, myosin binding protein H
- External IDs: OMIM: 160795; MGI: 1858196; GeneCards: MYBPH

Gene location (Human)
Chr.	Chromosome 1 (human)
Band	1q32.1	Start	203,167,811 bp
Band	1q32.1	End	203,175,826 bp

Gene location (Mouse)
Chr.	Chromosome 1 (mouse)
Band	1|1 E4	Start	134,121,186 bp
Band	1|1 E4	End	134,128,970 bp
RNA expression pattern
Bgee	Human / Mouse (ortholog); Top expressed in: gastrocnemius muscle; glutes; muscle of thigh; triceps brachii muscle; tibialis anterior muscle; biceps brachii; vastus lateralis muscle; skeletal muscle tissue; deltoid muscle; minor salivary glands / Top expressed in: muscle of thigh; vastus lateralis muscle; triceps brachii muscle; ankle; medial head of gastrocnemius muscle; lip; digastric muscle; skeletal muscle tissue; intercostal muscle; esophagus; More reference expression data
BioGPS	n/a
Gene ontology
Molecular function	protein binding; structural constituent of muscle; actin filament binding; muscle alpha-actinin binding; structural molecule activity conferring elasticity
Cellular component	myosin filament; muscle myosin complex; Z discdkac; M band
Biological process	regulation of striated muscle contraction; cell adhesion; actin filament organization; sarcomere organization; striated muscle myosin thick filament assembly
Sources:Amigo / QuickGO
Orthologs
Databases	NCBI: entry; OMA: entry
Species	Human	Mouse
Entrez	4608	53311
Ensembl	ENSG00000133055	ENSMUSG00000042451
UniProt	Q13203	P70402
RefSeq (mRNA)	NM_004997	NM_016749; NM_001357515
RefSeq (protein)	NP_004988	NP_058029; NP_001344444
Location (UCSC)	Chr 1: 203.17 – 203.18 Mb	Chr 1: 134.12 – 134.13 Mb
PubMed search
- Wikidata
View/Edit Human	View/Edit Mouse

Myosin binding protein H (MYBPH) is a protein that in humans is encoded by the MYBPH gene. MYBPH is a structural muscle protein that shares sequence and structural similarities to myosin binding protein C (MyBPC) and is found mostly in skeletal muscle.

== Gene ==
=== Aliases ===
MYBPH is historically known as H-protein.

=== Location ===
The human MYBPH gene is on the long arm of chromosome 1 (1q32.1), contains eleven exons, and spans 11,404 base pairs (bp) on the minus strand. It is immediately downstream of adenosine A_{1} receptor (ADORA1) and directly upstream of chitinase-3-like protein 1 (CHI3L1), as well as downstream of myogenin (MYOG) and upstream of chitinase (CHIT1).

=== Expression ===
MYBPH has low to moderate expression in a number of different tissues. The gene's expression is variable and ubiquitous amongst tissues, with the highest expression, in decreasing order, in skeletal muscle, the liver, placenta, trachea, and pancreas.

=== Transcript variants ===
In humans, MYBPH has two transcript variants, 1 and X1. While the main transcript variant has eleven exons, the alternative transcript variant contains an additional 5’ exon. Variant 1 is 1,818 nucleotides (nt) long and has 11 exons. Variant X1 is 3,921 nt long and contains 12 exons, differing from variant 1 in that it encodes a different N-terminus and utilizes a different promoter sequence.

== Protein ==
=== Isoforms ===
Human MYBPH's two transcript variants, 1 (477 amino acids (aa)) and X1 (518 aa), encode two protein isoforms, 1 and X1. Isoform 1 of MYBPH has a calculated molecular weight of approximately 52 kDa. Isoform X1 has a calculated molecular weight of approximately 56.4 kDa.

Isoform Number	Accession Number	mRNA Length (nt)	Protein Length (aa)	Molecular Weight (kDa)	Impact on Protein Produced
1	NM_004997.3	1,818	477	52	Eleven exons
X1	XM_047421205.1	3,921	518	56.4	Twelve exons, different N-terminus encoded

=== Domains ===
MYBPH has a UV excision repair protein Rad23 (Rad23) domain, two fibronectin type III (FN3) domains that also act as interdomain contacts [active] and cytokine receptor motifs [active], and two immunoglobulin (Ig and I-set) domains that each contain several Ig strands (B, C, E, F, G).

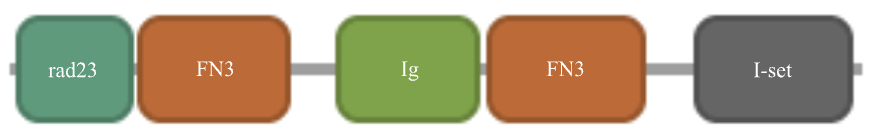
Human MYBPH protein schematic.

The UV excision repair protein Rad23 (Rad23) domain targets nucleotide excision repair to specific parts of the genome. Fibronectin type III (FN3) domain is an internal repeat found in fibronectin whose tenth repeat contains an Arginyl-Glycyl-Aspartic acid (RGD) cell recognition sequence. Immunoglobulin (Ig) domains are a heterogenous group of proteins built on two beta sheets.

=== Abundance ===
The MYBPH protein is less abundant than most other proteins in humans, as it falls under 1 ppm. The protein's highest abundance in humans is in the skeletal muscle, following with the next highest in the esophagus.

=== Structure ===
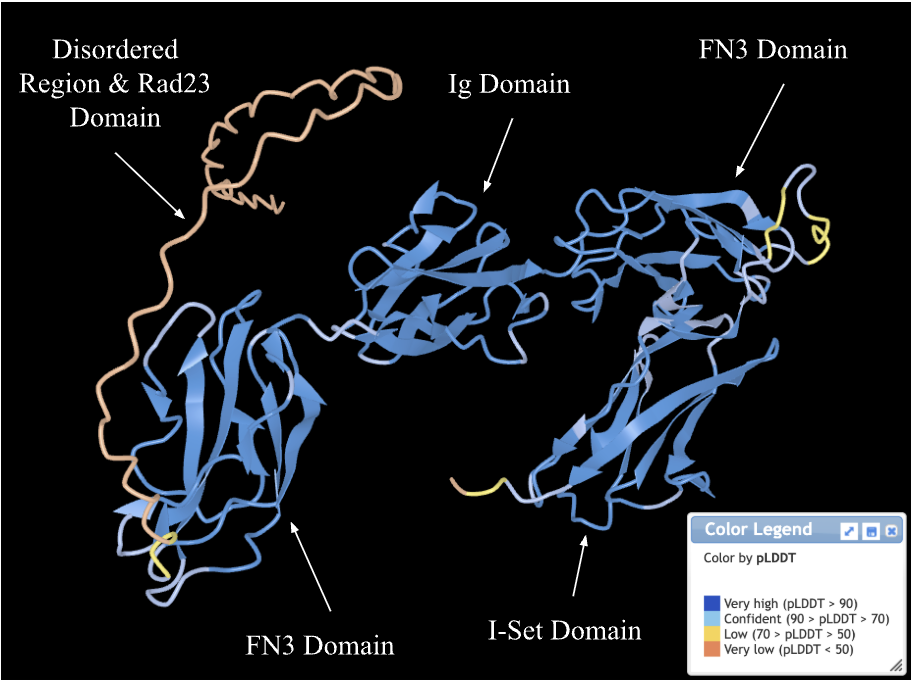
Annotated tertiary ribbon structure of human MYBPH colored by level of pLDDT.

The tertiary ribbon structure of MYBPH shows the disordered region and Rad23 domain of the strand to be a stretched out, while the fibronectin type III (FN3) domains and immunoglobulin (Ig and I-set) domains of the strand are wrapped around themselves.

== Post-translational modifications ==
=== Phosphorylation and ubiquitylation ===
There are seven predicted phosphorylation sites and four predicted ubiquitylation sites in human MYBPH, which are also present in mouse and rat MYBPH proteins.

=== C-mannosylation and O-GalNAc glycosylation ===
Human MYBPH is predicted to have seven C-mannosylation sites that are not heavily conserved in strict orthologs nor distant homologs.

The protein is also predicted to have eleven O-GalNAc glycosylation sites that are not heavily conserved in strict orthologs nor distant homologs.

== Homology ==
=== Orthologs ===
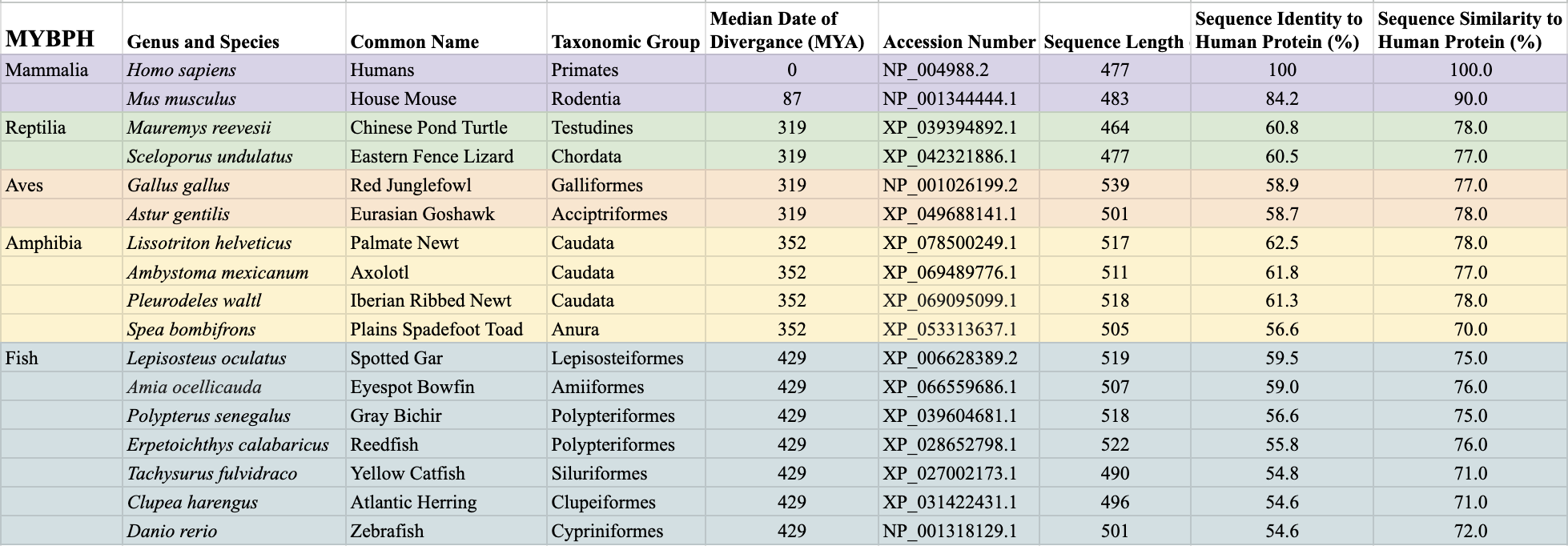
Orthologs of human MYBPH. Sorted by median date of divergence and by sequence identity to the human protein. Color coordinated by species type.

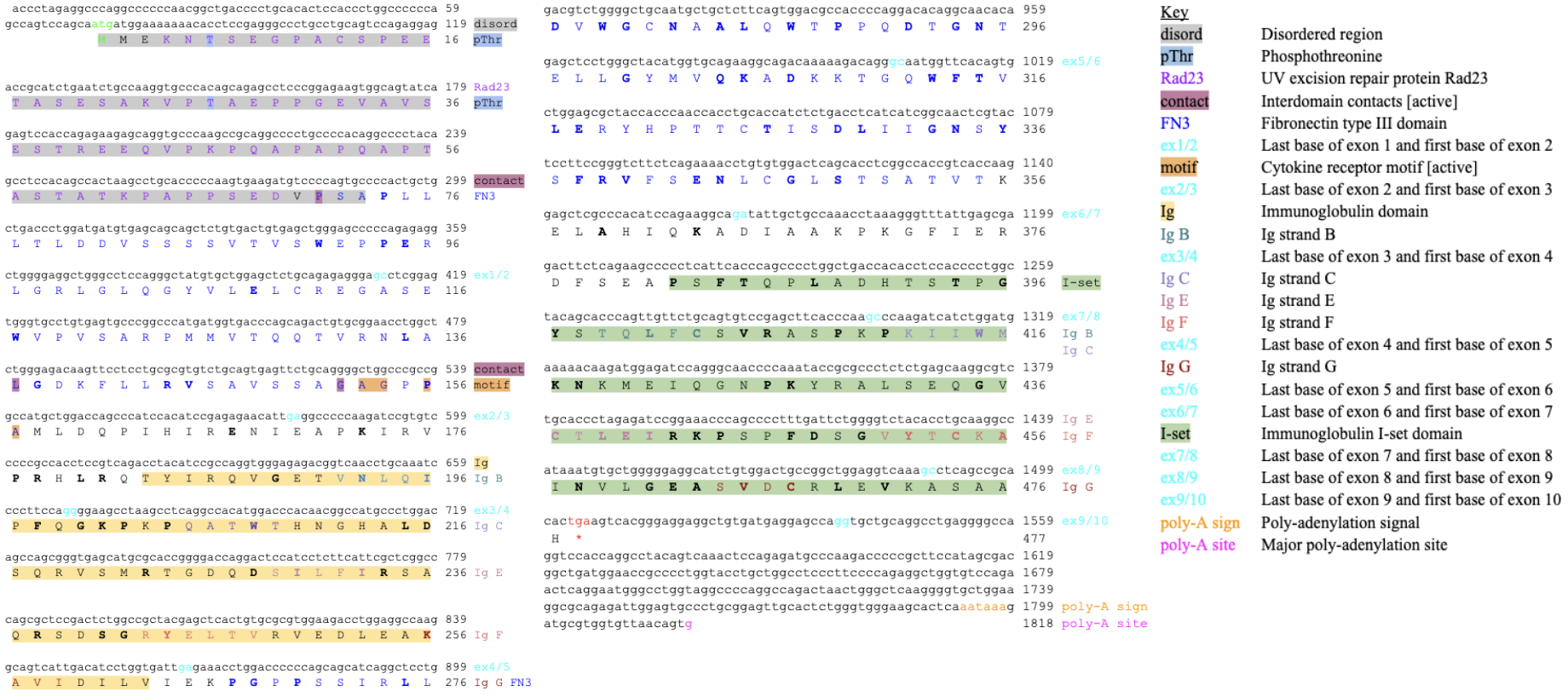
Human MYBPH conceptual translation. Highly conserved amino acids are in bold.

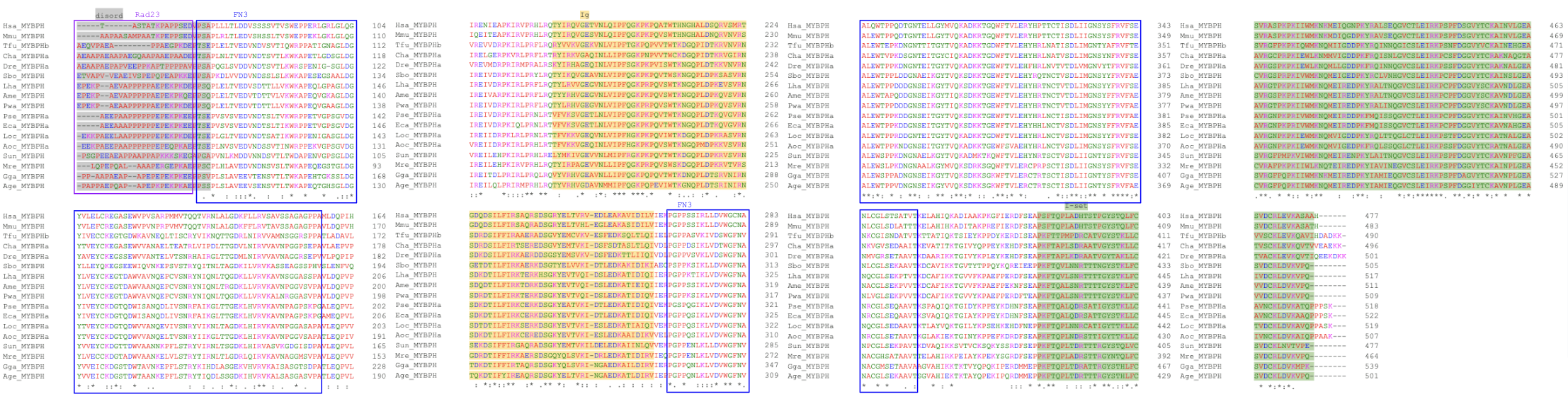
Multiple sequence alignment of human MYBPH orthologs. Amino acids color-coded based on chemistry. Stars indicate completely conserved amino acids, two dots indicate mostly conserved, and one dot indicates sometimes conserved. Annotations transferred from conceptual translation.

Fish are the most distantly related class to human MYBPH with the farthest median date of divergence being 429 million years ago. Whereas, mammalia is the closest related class to human MYBPH with the farthest median date of divergence being 87 million years ago. Reptilia, aves, and amphibia are moderately related to human MYBPH.

=== Paralogs ===
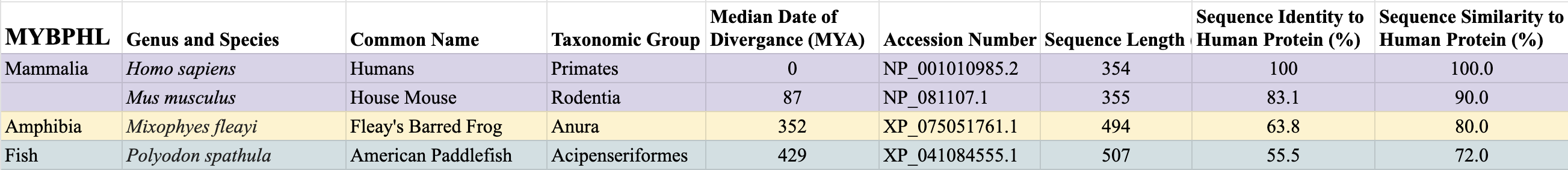
Orthologs of human MYBPHL. Sorted by median date of divergence and by sequence identity to the human protein. Color coordinated by species type.

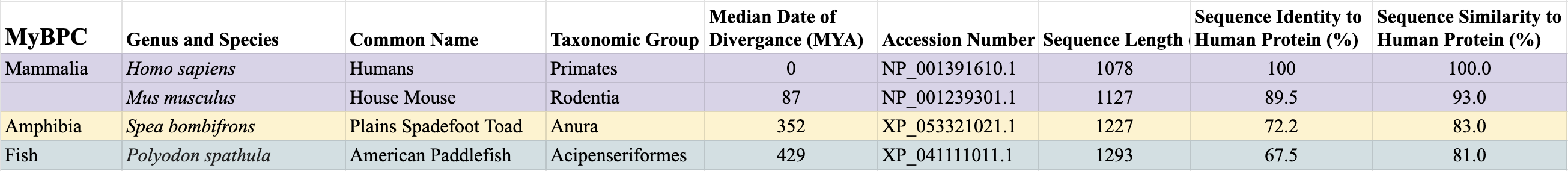
Orthologs of human MyBPC. Sorted by median date of divergence and by sequence identity to the human protein. Color coordinated by species type.

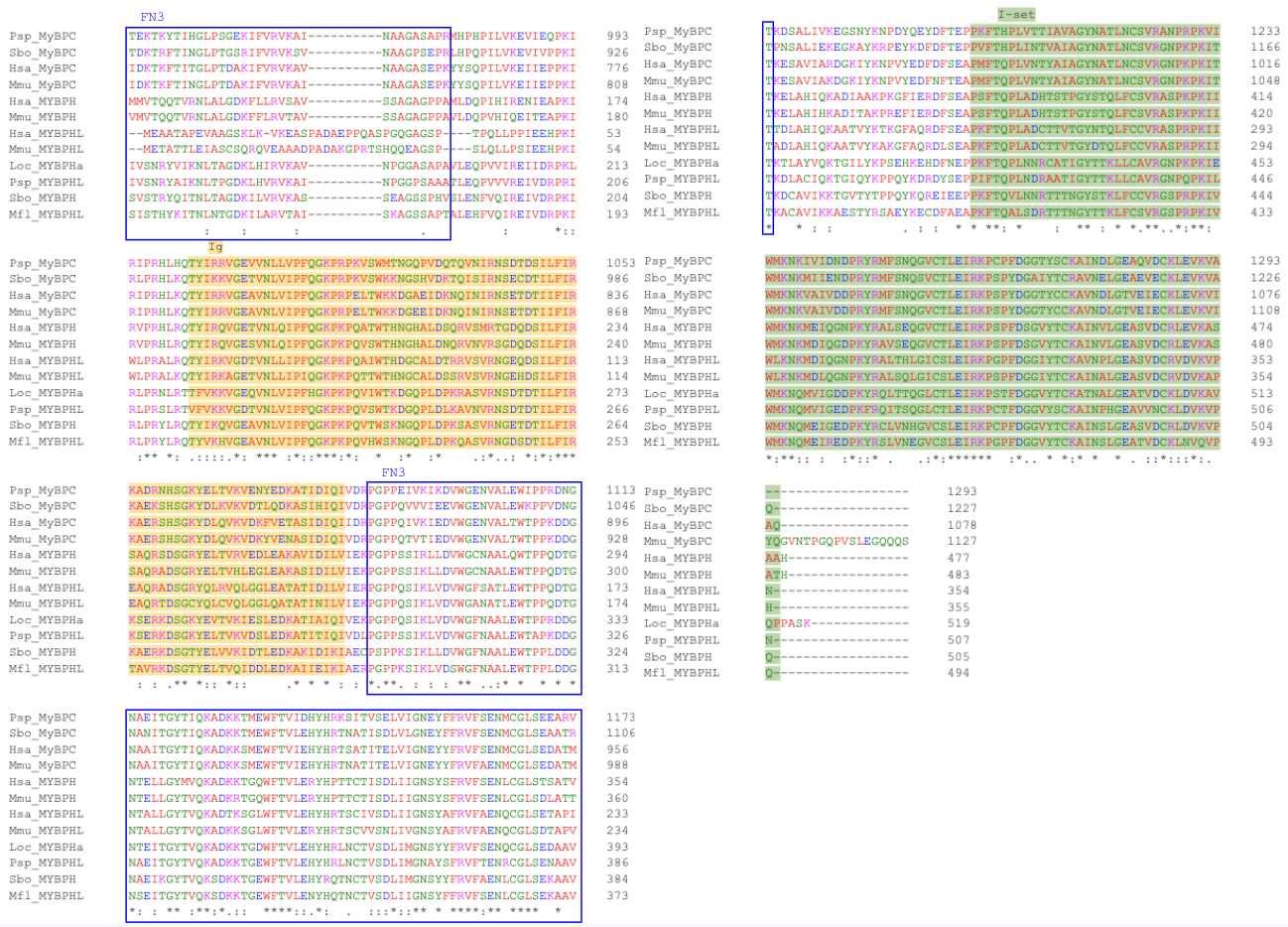
Multiple sequence alignment of human MYBPH paralogs. Amino acids color-coded based on chemistry. Stars indicate completely conserved amino acids, two dots indicate mostly conserved, and one dot indicates sometimes conserved. Annotations transferred from conceptual translation.

Human MYBPH has eight paralogs. The closest related paralog is myosin binding protein H-like (MYBPHL) and the second closest related paralog is myosin binding protein C (MyBPC).

=== Evolution ===
MYBPH is estimated to have first appeared in fish approximately 429 million years ago. The protein is found in a variety of ray-finned fish and lobe-finned fish, but does not appear in cartilaginous fish. The most distantly related species compared to humans with MYBPH are lobe-finned fish. The protein is found only in vertebrates, as there are no proteins of the same identity in any invertebrates.

The gene family consists of three genes, MYBPH and its paralogs MYBPHL and MyBPC. MYBPHL appears in ray-finned fish but not lobe-finned fish, while MyBPC appears in lobe-finned fish.

MYBPH is evolving more quickly than its paralogs (MYBPHL and MyBPC), cytochrome C, and fibrinogen complement factor 1.

== Function ==
MYBPH contributes to sarcomere organization and striated muscle contraction. It is associated with the myosin filament and is active in the M band in sarcomeres. In muscle cells, MYBPH functions through binding-related activity and structural molecule activity to support the organization of the sarcomere.

=== Interacting proteins ===
The protein found with the highest level of interaction with MYBPH is OCA2. Each of the proteins found to interact with MYBPH do so by either textmining, direct interaction, or physical association.

Abbreviated Name	Full Name	Basis of Identification	Score	Confidence Value	Link	Description	Source
OCA2	P Protein	Not listed	0.996	-	Textmining	Involved in the transport of tyrosine, the precursor to melanin synthesis, within the melanocyte.	STRING
GLDC	Glycine Dehydrogenase	Not listed	0.994	-	Textmining	Catalyzes the degradation of glycine.	STRING
SLAMF1	Signaling Lymphocytic Activation Molecule	Not listed	0.994	-	Textmining	Self-ligand receptor of the signaling lymphocytic activation molecule (SLAM) family.	STRING
CD46	Membrane Cofactor Protein	Not listed	0.993	-	Textmining	Acts as a cofactor for complement factor I.	STRING
NECTIN4	Processed Poliovirus Receptor-Related Protein 4	Not listed	0.993	-	Textmining	Involved in cell adhesion through trans-homophilic and -heterophilic interactions.	STRING
AMT	Aminomethyltransferase	Not listed	0.984	-	Textmining	Catalyzes the degradation of glycine.	STRING
GCSH	Glycine Cleavage System H Protein	Not listed	0.957	-	Textmining	Catalyzes the degradation of glycine.	STRING
C3	Complement C3c Alpha Chain Fragment 1	Not listed	0.857	-	Textmining	Plays a role in the activation of the complement system.	STRING
TLR2	Toll-Like Receptor 2	Not listed	0.836	-	Textmining	Works with LY96 to mediate the innate immune response to bacterial lipoproteins and other microbial cell wall components.	STRING
CFH	Complement Factor H	Not listed	0.798	-	Textmining	Glycoprotein that plays a role in maintaining a well-balanced immune response by modulating complement activation.	STRING
ROCK1	Rho-Associated Coiled-Coil Containing Protein Kinase 1	Pull down	-	0.54	Direct interaction	Regulates the shape, movement, and structural foundation of cells.	MINT - PSICQUIC
BAG3	Bcl2 Associated Athanogene 3	Affinity chromatography	-	465	Physical association	Regulates apoptosis, development, cell motility, autophagy, and tumor metastasis and mediates cell adaptive responses to stressful stimuli.	InnateDB - PSICQUIC
UBL7	Ubiquitin-Like Protein SB132	Two hybrid fragment pooling	-	0.37	Physical association	Regulator of protein homeostasis and innate immunity.	IMEx - PSICQUIC
CAPN3	Calcium-Activated Neutral Proteinase 3	Two hybrid fragment pooling	-	0.37	Physical association	Breaks down damaged proteins for removal, organizes muscle units, and regulates calcium levels essential for muscle contraction and relaxation.	IMEx - PSICQUIC

== Clinical significance ==
MYBPH was discovered in acting as a modifier of cardiac hypertrophy in hypertrophic cardiomyopathy (HCM) patients. It is shown to function in concert with cardiac myosin binding protein C (cMYBPC) in regulating cardiomyocyte contraction. There is a significant association between a MYBPH variant (rs2250509) and hypertrophy traits in one of the HCM-causing founder mutations (pA797T in β-myosin heavy chain gene (MYH7)).

MYBPH is a transcriptional target of Thyroid Transcription Factor-1 (TTF-1) that inhibits assembly competence-conferring phosphorylation of the myosin regulatory light chain (RLC) and activates phosphorylation of LIM domain kinase (LIMK) through its interaction with Rho kinase 1 (ROCK1). MYBPH's interaction with ROCK1 inhibits the enzyme and negatively regulates actomyosin organization, reducing single cell motility and increasing collective cell migration that results in decreased cancer invasion and metastasis.
