= RIMBP2 =

Protein-coding gene in the species Homo sapiens

Identifiers
- Aliases: RIMBP2, PPP1R133, RBP2, RIM-BP2, RIMS binding protein 2
- External IDs: OMIM: 611602; MGI: 2443235; GeneCards: RIMBP2
Available structures
PDB	Ortholog search: PDBe RCSB
PDB	List of PDB id codes 1WIE, 2CSI, 2CSP, 2CSQ

Gene location (Human)
Chr.	Chromosome 12 (human)
Band	12q24.33	Start	130,396,137 bp
Band	12q24.33	End	130,716,281 bp

Gene location (Mouse)
Chr.	Chromosome 5 (mouse)
Band	5|5 G1.3	Start	128,834,855 bp
Band	5|5 G1.3	End	129,030,550 bp
RNA expression pattern
Bgee	Human / Mouse (ortholog); Top expressed in: Brodmann area 10; frontal pole; pituitary gland; Region I of hippocampus proper; anterior pituitary; orbitofrontal cortex; Brodmann area 46; superior frontal gyrus; middle temporal gyrus; postcentral gyrus / Top expressed in: visual cortex; primary visual cortex; dentate gyrus of hippocampal formation granule cell; superior frontal gyrus; superior cervical ganglion; islet of Langerhans; prefrontal cortex; piriform cortex; cingulate gyrus; primary motor cortex; More reference expression data
BioGPS	n/a
Orthologs
Databases	NCBI: entry; OMA: entry
Species	Human	Mouse
Entrez	23504	231760
Ensembl	ENSG00000060709	ENSMUSG00000029420
UniProt	O15034	Q80U40
RefSeq (mRNA)	NM_015347; NM_001351226; NM_001351227; NM_001351228; NM_001351229 NM_001351230; NM_001351231; NM_001351232; NM_001351233	NM_001081388; NM_001310733; NM_001378900
RefSeq (protein)	NP_056162; NP_001338155; NP_001338156; NP_001338157; NP_001338158 NP_001338159; NP_001338160; NP_001338161; NP_001338162	NP_001074857; NP_001297662; NP_001365829
Location (UCSC)	Chr 12: 130.4 – 130.72 Mb	Chr 5: 128.83 – 129.03 Mb
PubMed search
- Wikidata
View/Edit Human	View/Edit Mouse

RIMS binding protein 2 is a protein that in humans is encoded by the RIMBP2 gene. This protein plays a significant role in synaptic transmission and is involved in the regulation of voltage-gated calcium channels, which are crucial for neurotransmitter release at synapses.

== Function and characteristics ==
RIMBP2 is primarily located in the presynaptic active zones of neurons, where it contributes to the organization and maintenance of synaptic structures. It is essential for the proper functioning of synaptic vesicles and calcium-dependent processes that facilitate communication between neurons.

== Clinical relevance ==
Research has indicated that mutations or dysregulation of RIMBP2 may be associated with various neurological disorders, such as Pitt-Hopkins syndrome.
