= FNDC3A =

Protein-coding gene in the species Homo sapiens

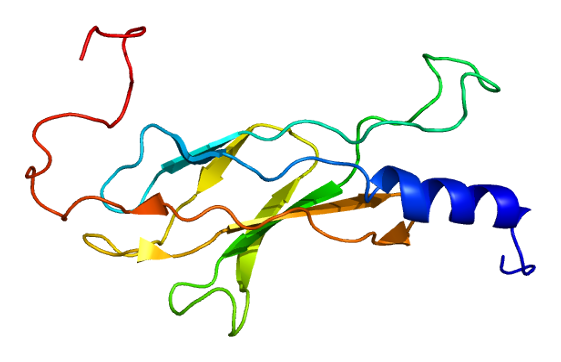

Identifiers
- Aliases: FNDC3A, FNDC3, HUGO, bA203I16.1, bA203I16.5, fibronectin type III domain containing 3A
- External IDs: OMIM: 615794; MGI: 1196463; GeneCards: FNDC3A
Available structures
PDB	Ortholog search: PDBe RCSB
PDB	List of PDB id codes 1WK0, 1X3D, 1X4X, 1X5X, 2CRM, 2CRZ

Gene location (Human)
Chr.	Chromosome 13 (human)
Band	13q14.2	Start	48,975,912 bp
Band	13q14.2	End	49,209,779 bp

Gene location (Mouse)
Chr.	Chromosome 14 (mouse)
Band	14 D2|14 37.62 cM	Start	72,775,386 bp
Band	14 D2|14 37.62 cM	End	72,947,443 bp
RNA expression pattern
Bgee	Human / Mouse (ortholog); Top expressed in: corpus epididymis; caput epididymis; jejunal mucosa; cardia; tail of epididymis; germinal epithelium; decidua; islet of Langerhans; mucosa of paranasal sinus; body of pancreas / Top expressed in: parotid gland; decidua; seminal vesicula; median eminence; lacrimal gland; submandibular gland; arcuate nucleus; gastrula; islet of Langerhans; pineal gland; More reference expression data
BioGPS	n/a
Gene ontology
Molecular function	RNA binding
Cellular component	integral component of membrane; cytosol; Golgi membrane; Golgi apparatus; acrosomal vesicle; membrane; cytoplasmic vesicle; vesicle membrane
Biological process	fertilization; Sertoli cell development; spermatid development; cell-cell adhesion
Sources:Amigo / QuickGO
Orthologs
Databases	NCBI: entry; OMA: entry
Species	Human	Mouse
Entrez	22862	319448
Ensembl	ENSG00000102531	ENSMUSG00000033487
UniProt	Q9Y2H6	Q8BX90
RefSeq (mRNA)	NM_001079673; NM_001278438; NM_014923	NM_207636
RefSeq (protein)	NP_001073141; NP_001265367; NP_055738	NP_997519
Location (UCSC)	Chr 13: 48.98 – 49.21 Mb	Chr 14: 72.78 – 72.95 Mb
PubMed search
- Wikidata
View/Edit Human	View/Edit Mouse

Fibronectin type-III domain-containing protein 3a is a protein that in humans is encoded by the FNDC3A gene.
