= LRRN2 =

Protein-coding gene in humans

Identifiers
- Aliases: LRRN2, FIGLER7, GAC1, LRANK1, LRRN5, leucine rich repeat neuronal 2
- External IDs: OMIM: 605492; MGI: 106037; GeneCards: LRRN2

Gene location (Human)
Chr.	Chromosome 1 (human)
Band	1q32.1	Start	204,617,170 bp
Band	1q32.1	End	204,685,738 bp

Gene location (Mouse)
Chr.	Chromosome 1 (mouse)
Band	1|1 E4	Start	132,808,011 bp
Band	1|1 E4	End	132,867,743 bp
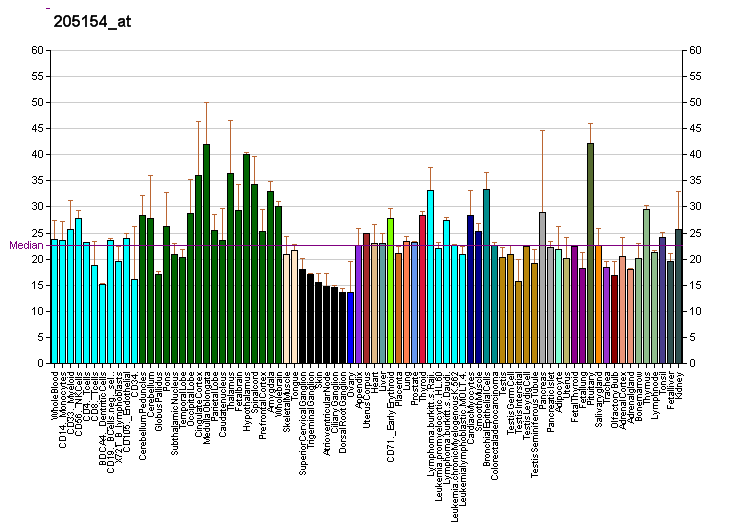
RNA expression pattern
Bgee	Human / Mouse (ortholog); Top expressed in: prefrontal cortex; Region I of hippocampus proper; Brodmann area 10; Epithelium of choroid plexus; ventricular zone; nucleus accumbens; anterior pituitary; cingulate gyrus; anterior cingulate cortex; ganglionic eminence / Top expressed in: lateral geniculate nucleus; medial dorsal nucleus; dentate gyrus; dentate gyrus of hippocampal formation granule cell; subiculum; medial geniculate nucleus; primary visual cortex; anterior amygdaloid area; ventromedial nucleus; dorsomedial hypothalamic nucleus; More reference expression data
BioGPS	More reference expression data
Gene ontology
Molecular function	signaling receptor activity
Cellular component	integral component of membrane; membrane; extracellular space; extracellular matrix
Biological process	cell adhesion; axonogenesis; signal transduction
Sources:Amigo / QuickGO
Orthologs
Databases	NCBI: entry; OMA: entry
Species	Human	Mouse
Entrez	10446	16980
Ensembl	ENSG00000170382	ENSMUSG00000026443
UniProt	O75325	Q6PHP6
RefSeq (mRNA)	NM_006338; NM_201630	NM_010732
RefSeq (protein)	NP_006329; NP_963924	NP_034862
Location (UCSC)	Chr 1: 204.62 – 204.69 Mb	Chr 1: 132.81 – 132.87 Mb
PubMed search
- Wikidata
View/Edit Human	View/Edit Mouse

Leucine-rich repeat neuronal protein 2 is a protein that in humans is encoded by the LRRN2 gene.

The protein encoded by this gene belongs to the leucine-rich repeat superfamily. This gene was found to be amplified and overexpressed in malignant gliomas. The encoded protein has homology with other proteins that function as cell-adhesion molecules or as signal transduction receptors and is a candidate for the target gene in the 1q32.1 amplicon in malignant gliomas. Two alternatively spliced transcript variants encoding the same protein have been described for this gene.
