= PTPRF =

Protein-coding gene in humans

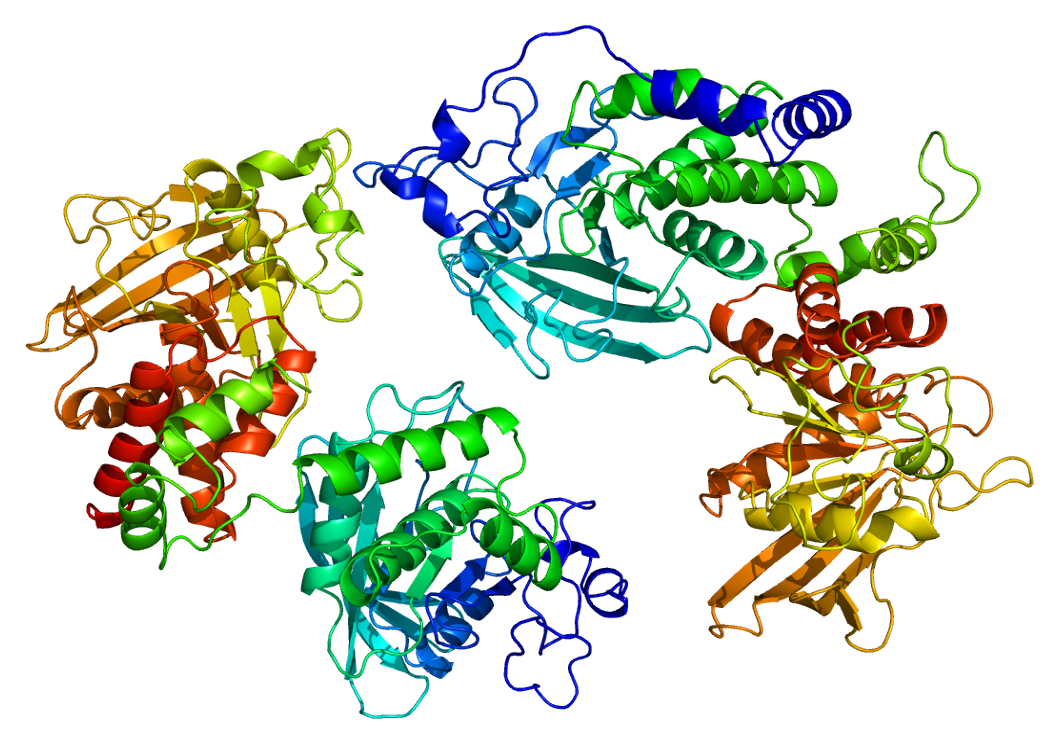

Identifiers
- Aliases: PTPRF, LAR, BNAH2, protein tyrosine phosphatase, receptor type F, protein tyrosine phosphatase receptor type F
- External IDs: OMIM: 179590; MGI: 102695; GeneCards: PTPRF
Available structures
PDB	Ortholog search: PDBe RCSB
PDB	List of PDB id codes 1LAR, 2DJU, 2EDX, 2EDY, 2YD5, 2YD8, 4N5U, 2DN7
Enzyme activity
EC #	BRENDA	ExPASy	KEGG	MetaCyc
3.1.3.48	↗	↗	↗	↗

Gene location (Human)
Chr.	Chromosome 1 (human)
Band	1p34.2	Start	43,525,187 bp
Band	1p34.2	End	43,623,666 bp

Gene location (Mouse)
Chr.	Chromosome 4 (mouse)
Band	4|4 D2.1	Start	118,208,213 bp
Band	4|4 D2.1	End	118,291,405 bp
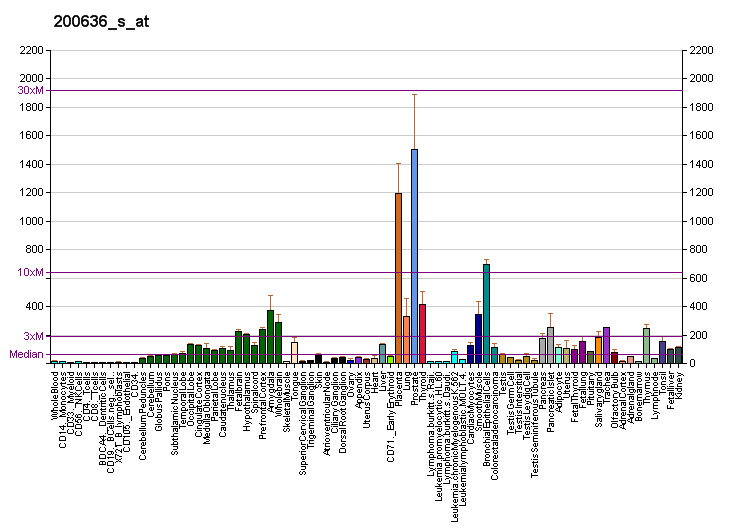

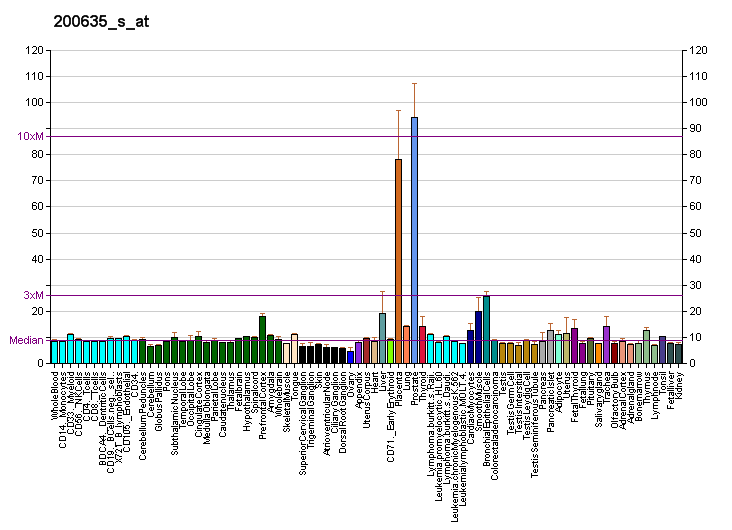

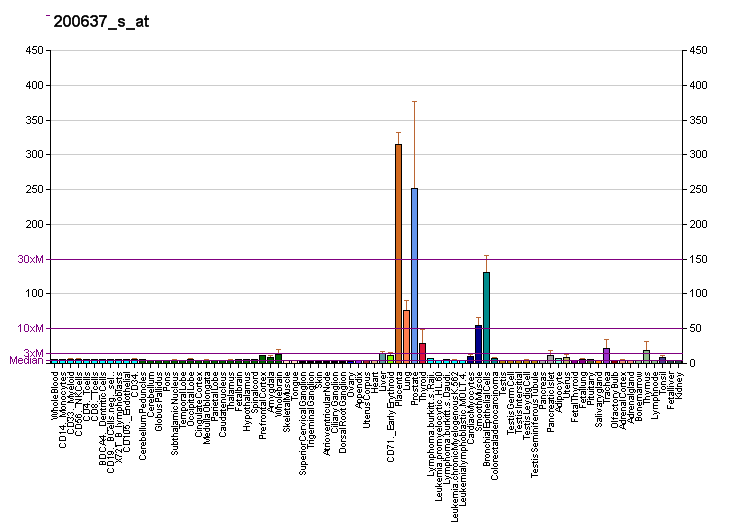
RNA expression pattern
Bgee	Human / Mouse (ortholog); Top expressed in: gingival epithelium; bronchial epithelial cell; nipple; parotid gland; hair follicle; germinal epithelium; jejunal mucosa; skin of arm; skin of thigh; epithelium of nasopharynx / Top expressed in: medullary collecting duct; epithelium of lens; transitional epithelium of urinary bladder; hair follicle; vestibular sensory epithelium; vestibular membrane of cochlear duct; external carotid artery; conjunctival fornix; left lung; left lung lobe; More reference expression data
BioGPS	More reference expression data
Gene ontology
Molecular function	chondroitin sulfate proteoglycan binding; heparin binding; phosphoprotein phosphatase activity; phosphatase activity; protein-containing complex binding; protein tyrosine phosphatase activity; transmembrane receptor protein tyrosine phosphatase activity; hydrolase activity; cell adhesion molecule binding
Cellular component	integral component of membrane; membrane; integral component of plasma membrane; soma; neuron projection; extracellular exosome; plasma membrane
Biological process	neuron projection regeneration; regulation of axon regeneration; negative regulation of receptor binding; regulation of neuron projection development; protein dephosphorylation; transmembrane receptor protein tyrosine phosphatase signaling pathway; cell adhesion; peptidyl-tyrosine dephosphorylation; cell migration; dephosphorylation; synaptic membrane adhesion
Sources:Amigo / QuickGO
Orthologs
Databases	NCBI: entry; OMA: entry
Species	Human	Mouse
Entrez	5792	19268
Ensembl	ENSG00000142949	ENSMUSG00000033295
UniProt	P10586	A2A8L5
RefSeq (mRNA)	NM_002840; NM_130440; NM_001329137; NM_001329138; NM_001329139 NM_001329140	NM_011213
RefSeq (protein)	NP_001316066; NP_001316067; NP_001316068; NP_001316069; NP_002831 NP_569707	NP_035343
Location (UCSC)	Chr 1: 43.53 – 43.62 Mb	Chr 4: 118.21 – 118.29 Mb
PubMed search
- Wikidata
View/Edit Human	View/Edit Mouse

Receptor-type tyrosine-protein phosphatase F is an enzyme that, in humans, is encoded by the PTPRF gene.

The protein encoded by this gene is a member of the protein tyrosine phosphatase (PTP) family. PTPs are known to be signaling molecules that regulate a variety of cellular processes, including cell growth, differentiation, mitotic cycle, and oncogenic transformation. This PTP possesses an extracellular region, a single transmembrane region, and two tandem intracytoplasmic catalytic domains, and thus represents a receptor-type PTP. The extracellular region contains three Ig-like domains, and nine non-Ig-like domains similar to those of the neural cell adhesion molecule. This PTP was shown to function in the regulation of epithelial cell-cell contacts at adherens junctions, as well as in the control of beta-catenin signaling. An increased expression level of this protein was found in the insulin-responsive tissue of obese, insulin-resistant individuals and may contribute to the pathogenesis of insulin resistance. Two alternatively spliced transcript variants of this gene, which encode distinct proteins, have been reported.

== Interactions ==
PTPRF has been shown to interact with Beta-catenin and liprin-alpha-1.
