= PTPRO =

Protein-coding gene in the species Homo sapiens

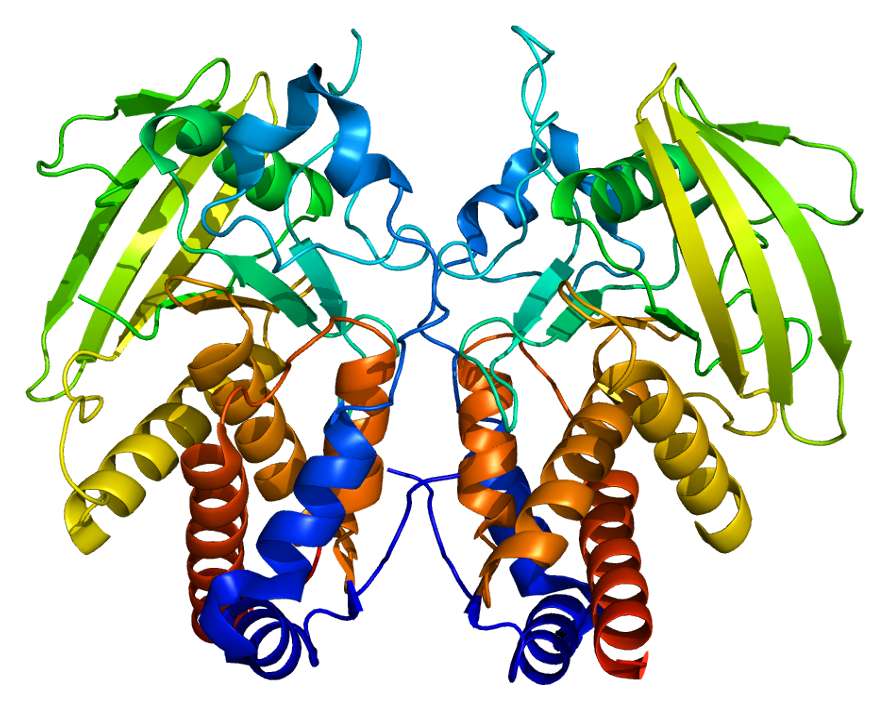

Identifiers
- Aliases: PTPRO, GLEPP1, NPHS6, PTP-OC, PTP-U2, PTPROT, PTPU2, R-PTP-O, protein tyrosine phosphatase, receptor type O, protein tyrosine phosphatase receptor type O
- External IDs: OMIM: 600579; MGI: 1097152; GeneCards: PTPRO
Available structures
PDB	Ortholog search: PDBe RCSB
PDB	List of PDB id codes 2G59, 2GJT
Enzyme activity
EC #	BRENDA	ExPASy	KEGG	MetaCyc
3.1.3.48	↗	↗	↗	↗

Gene location (Human)
Chr.	Chromosome 12 (human)
Band	12p12.3|12p13-p12	Start	15,322,257 bp
Band	12p12.3|12p13-p12	End	15,602,175 bp

Gene location (Mouse)
Chr.	Chromosome 6 (mouse)
Band	6|6 G1	Start	137,229,317 bp
Band	6|6 G1	End	137,440,231 bp
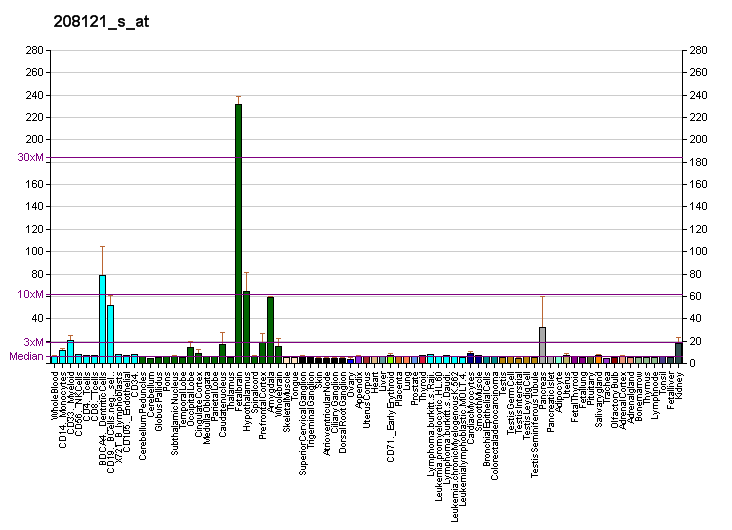
RNA expression pattern
Bgee	Human / Mouse (ortholog); Top expressed in: glomerulus; metanephric glomerulus; rectum; ganglionic eminence; middle temporal gyrus; human kidney; ventricular zone; nucleus accumbens; prefrontal cortex; mucosa of transverse colon / Top expressed in: renal corpuscle; arcuate nucleus; median eminence; olfactory bulb; barrel cortex; ventromedial nucleus; piriform cortex; mammillary body; dorsomedial hypothalamic nucleus; substantia nigra; More reference expression data
BioGPS	More reference expression data
Gene ontology
Molecular function	phosphoprotein phosphatase activity; protein homodimerization activity; phosphatase activity; Wnt-protein binding; protein binding; protein tyrosine phosphatase activity; transmembrane receptor protein tyrosine phosphatase activity; hydrolase activity
Cellular component	integral component of membrane; lateral plasma membrane; membrane; growth cone; plasma membrane; dendritic spine; integral component of plasma membrane; axon; apical plasma membrane; neuron projection; extracellular exosome; lamellipodium; glutamatergic synapse; GABA-ergic synapse; integral component of postsynaptic density membrane
Biological process	negative regulation of cell-substrate adhesion; negative regulation of neuron projection development; monocyte chemotaxis; negative regulation of retinal ganglion cell axon guidance; regulation of glomerular filtration; slit diaphragm assembly; protein dephosphorylation; glomerulus development; axon guidance; cell morphogenesis; glomerular visceral epithelial cell differentiation; peptidyl-tyrosine dephosphorylation; negative regulation of glomerular filtration; negative regulation of canonical Wnt signaling pathway; lamellipodium assembly; dephosphorylation; regulation of synapse organization
Sources:Amigo / QuickGO
Orthologs
Databases	NCBI: entry; OMA: entry
Species	Human	Mouse
Entrez	5800	19277
Ensembl	ENSG00000151490	ENSMUSG00000030223
UniProt	Q16827	E9Q612
RefSeq (mRNA)	NM_002848; NM_030667; NM_030668; NM_030669; NM_030670 NM_030671	NM_001164401; NM_001164402; NM_001164403; NM_011216
RefSeq (protein)	NP_002839; NP_109592; NP_109593; NP_109594; NP_109595 NP_109596	NP_001157873; NP_001157874; NP_001157875; NP_035346
Location (UCSC)	Chr 12: 15.32 – 15.6 Mb	Chr 6: 137.23 – 137.44 Mb
PubMed search
- Wikidata
View/Edit Human	View/Edit Mouse

Receptor-type tyrosine-protein phosphatase O is an enzyme that in humans is encoded by the PTPRO gene.

This gene encodes a receptor-type protein tyrosine phosphatase containing a single intracellular catalytic domain with a characteristic signature motif. The gene product, which has a transmembrane domain, is an integral membrane protein. Several alternatively spliced transcript variants, some of which encode different isoforms of the protein, have been described. These variants exhibit tissue-specific expression.
