= PTPRG =

Protein-coding gene in the species Homo sapiens

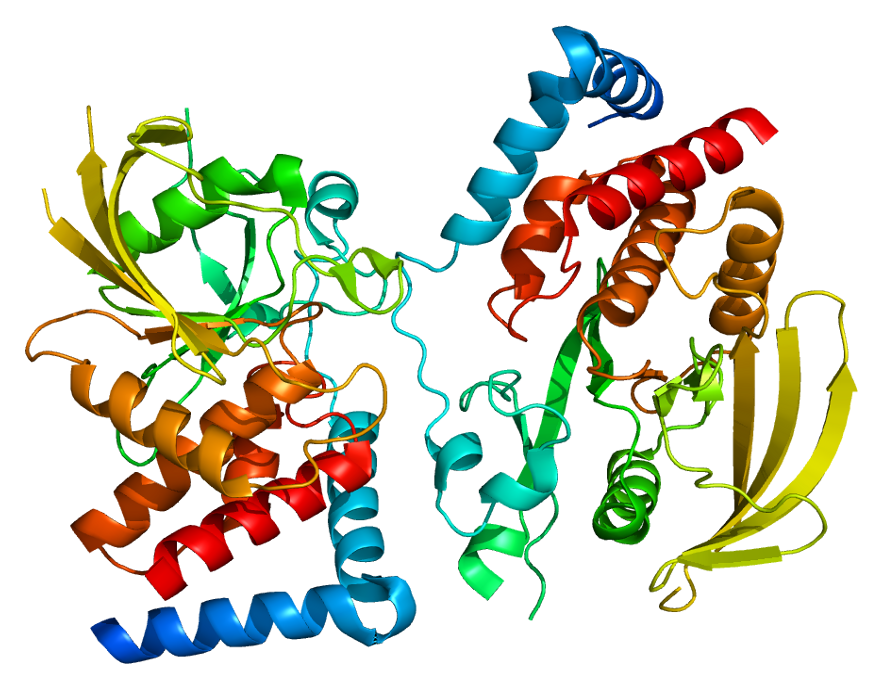

Identifiers
- Aliases: PTPRG, HPTPG, PTPG, R-PTP-GAMMA, RPTPG, protein tyrosine phosphatase, receptor type G, protein tyrosine phosphatase receptor type G
- External IDs: OMIM: 176886; MGI: 97814; GeneCards: PTPRG
Available structures
PDB	Ortholog search: PDBe RCSB
PDB	List of PDB id codes 2H4V, 2HY3, 2NLK, 2PBN, 3JXH, 3QCB, 3QCC, 3QCD, 3QCE, 3QCF, 3QCG, 3QCH, 3QCI, 3QCJ, 3QCK, 3QCL, 3QCM, 3QCN
Enzyme activity
EC #	BRENDA	ExPASy	KEGG	MetaCyc
3.1.3.48	↗	↗	↗	↗

Gene location (Human)
Chr.	Chromosome 3 (human)
Band	3p14.2	Start	61,561,569 bp
Band	3p14.2	End	62,297,609 bp
RNA expression pattern
Bgee	Human / Mouse (ortholog); Top expressed in: Achilles tendon; lower lobe of lung; caput epididymis; synovial joint; buccal mucosa cell; oocyte; pericardium; corpus epididymis; urethra; stromal cell of endometrium / n/a; More reference expression data
BioGPS	n/a
Gene ontology
Molecular function	protein tyrosine phosphatase activity; phosphatase activity; transmembrane receptor protein tyrosine phosphatase activity; protein binding; phosphoprotein phosphatase activity; hydrolase activity; identical protein binding
Cellular component	integral component of membrane; integral component of plasma membrane; extracellular exosome; membrane; extracellular space
Biological process	regulation of homophilic cell adhesion; protein dephosphorylation; negative regulation of epithelial cell migration; transmembrane receptor protein tyrosine kinase signaling pathway; dephosphorylation; brain development; negative regulation of neuron projection development; peptidyl-tyrosine dephosphorylation
Sources:Amigo / QuickGO
Orthologs
Databases	NCBI: entry; OMA: entry
Species	Human	Mouse
Entrez	5793	19270
Ensembl	ENSG00000144724	n/a
UniProt	P23470	Q05909
RefSeq (mRNA)	NM_002841; NM_001375471	NM_008981; NM_001347593
RefSeq (protein)	NP_002832; NP_001362400	NP_001334522; NP_033007
Location (UCSC)	Chr 3: 61.56 – 62.3 Mb	n/a
PubMed search
- Wikidata
View/Edit Human	View/Edit Mouse

Receptor-type tyrosine-protein phosphatase gamma is an enzyme that in humans is encoded by the PTPRG gene.

The protein encoded by this gene is a member of the protein tyrosine phosphatase (PTP) family. PTPs are known to be signaling molecules that regulate a variety of cellular processes including cell growth, differentiation, mitotic cycle, and oncogenic transformation.

This PTP possesses an extracellular region, a single transmembrane region, and two tandem intracytoplasmic catalytic domains, and thus represents a receptor-type PTP. The extracellular region of this PTP contains a carbonic anhydrase-like (CAH) domain, which is also found in the extracellular region of PTPRBETA/ZETA. This gene is located in a chromosomal region that is frequently deleted in renal cell carcinoma and lung carcinoma, thus is thought to be a candidate tumor suppressor gene.
