= PTPRB =

Protein-coding gene in the species Homo sapiens

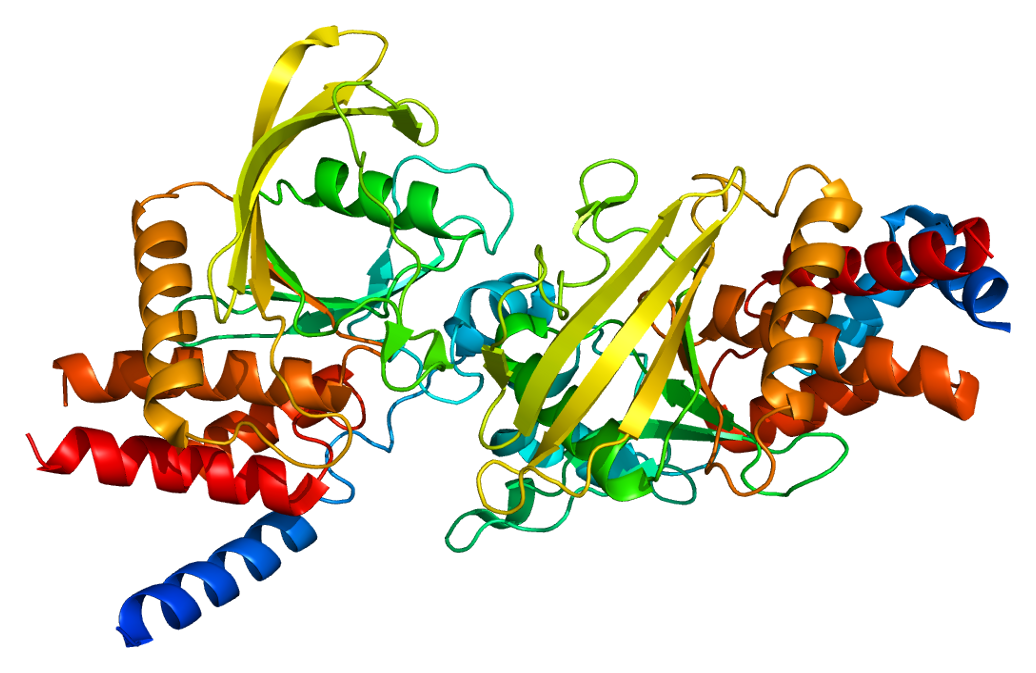

Identifiers
- Aliases: PTPRB, HPTP-BETA, HPTPB, PTPB, R-PTP-BETA, VEPTP, protein tyrosine phosphatase, receptor type B, protein tyrosine phosphatase receptor type B
- External IDs: OMIM: 176882; MGI: 97809; GeneCards: PTPRB
Available structures
| PDB | Ortholog search: PDBe RCSB |
| PDB | List of PDB id codes 2AHS, 2H02, 2H03, 2H04, 2HC1, 2HC2, 2I3R, 2I3U, 2I4E, 2I4G, 2I4H, 2I5X |
Enzyme activity
| EC # | BRENDA | ExPASy | KEGG | MetaCyc |
|---|---|---|---|---|
| 3.1.3.48 | ↗ | ↗ | ↗ | ↗ |

Gene location (Human)
| Chr. | Chromosome 12 (human) |
| Band | 12q15 | Start | 70,515,870 bp |
| Band | 12q15 | End | 70,637,440 bp |

Gene location (Mouse)
| Chr. | Chromosome 10 (mouse) |
| Band | 10|10 D2 | Start | 116,275,523 bp |
| Band | 10|10 D2 | End | 116,389,535 bp |
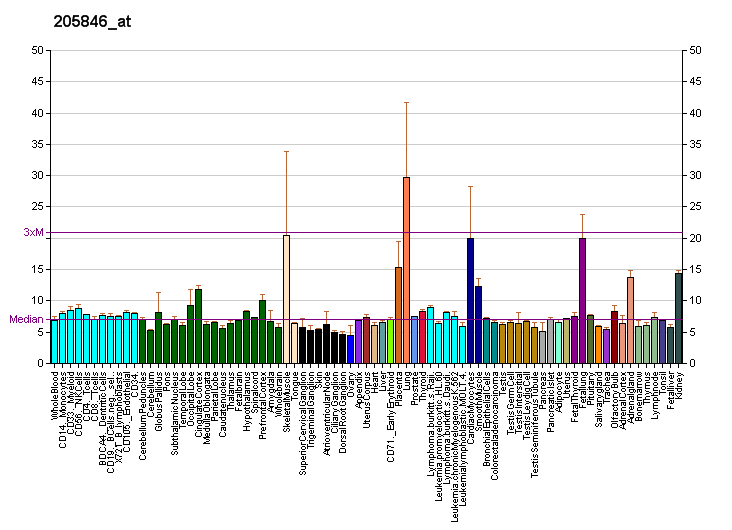
RNA expression pattern
| Bgee | Human / Mouse (ortholog); Top expressed in: endothelial cell; lower lobe of lung; visceral pleura; right lung; right ventricle; parietal pleura; upper lobe of lung; upper lobe of left lung; epithelium of colon; Skeletal muscle tissue of biceps brachii / Top expressed in: right lung; right lung lobe; left lung; external carotid artery; internal carotid artery; carotid body; left lung lobe; digastric muscle; lumbar subsegment of spinal cord; triceps brachii muscle; More reference expression data |
| BioGPS | More reference expression data |
Gene ontology
| Molecular function | protein tyrosine phosphatase activity; phosphatase activity; transmembrane receptor protein tyrosine phosphatase activity; protein binding; phosphoprotein phosphatase activity; hydrolase activity |
| Cellular component | integral component of membrane; receptor complex; integral component of plasma membrane; membrane; plasma membrane; specific granule membrane; tertiary granule membrane |
| Biological process | phosphate-containing compound metabolic process; protein dephosphorylation; angiogenesis; dephosphorylation; peptidyl-tyrosine dephosphorylation; neutrophil degranulation |
Sources:Amigo / QuickGO
Orthologs
| Databases | NCBI: entry; OMA: entry |
| Species | Human | Mouse |
| Entrez | 5787 | 19263 |
| Ensembl | ENSG00000127329 | ENSMUSG00000020154 |
| UniProt | P23467 | B2RU80 |
| RefSeq (mRNA) | NM_001109754; NM_001206971; NM_001206972; NM_002837; NM_001330204 | NM_029928 |
| RefSeq (protein) | NP_001103224; NP_001193900; NP_001193901; NP_001317133; NP_002828 | NP_084204 |
| Location (UCSC) | Chr 12: 70.52 – 70.64 Mb | Chr 10: 116.28 – 116.39 Mb |
| PubMed search |
- Wikidata
| View/Edit Human | View/Edit Mouse |

Receptor-type tyrosine-protein phosphatase beta or VE-PTP is an enzyme specifically expressed in endothelial cells that in humans is encoded by the PTPRB gene.

== Function ==
VE-PTP is a member of the classical protein tyrosine phosphatase (PTP) family. The deletion of the gene in mouse models was shown to be embryonically lethal, thus indicating that it is important for vasculogenesis and blood vessel development. In addition, it was shown to participate in adherens junctions complex and regulate vascular permeability. Recently, Soni et al. have shown that tyrosine phosphorylation of VE-PTP via Pyk2 kinase downstream of STIM1-induced calcium entry mediates disassembly of the endothelial adherens junctions.

== Interactions ==
VE-PTP contains an extracellular domain composed of multiple fibronectin type_III repeats, a single transmembrane segment and one intracytoplasmic catalytic domain, thus belongs to R3 receptor subtype PTPs. The extracellular region was shown to interact with the angiopoietin receptor Tie-2 and with the adhesion protein VE-cadherin.

VE-PTP was also found to interact with Grb2 and plakoglobin through its cytoplasmatic domain.

VE-PTP was also shown through proximity ligation assay to form a complex with VEGFR2, which is involved in regulation of angiogenesis and vascular permeability. Activation of VEGFR2 by VEGF was shown to induce complex dissociation, leading to increased VEGFR2 phosphorylation at tyrosine sites 1175 and 951 in immortalized endothelial cells.

== Role in disease ==
Dysregulation of PTPRB correlates with the development of a variety of tumors. PTPRB promotes metastasis of colorectal cancer cells via inducing epithelial-mesenchymal transition (EMT).
