= LRRN1 =

Protein-coding gene in the species Homo sapiens

Identifiers
- Aliases: LRRN1, FIGLER3, NLRR-1, leucine rich repeat neuronal 1, NLRR1
- External IDs: MGI: 106038; GeneCards: LRRN1

Gene location (Human)
Chr.	Chromosome 3 (human)
Band	3p26.2	Start	3,799,431 bp
Band	3p26.2	End	3,849,834 bp

Gene location (Mouse)
Chr.	Chromosome 6 (mouse)
Band	6|6 E1	Start	107,506,729 bp
Band	6|6 E1	End	107,547,175 bp
RNA expression pattern
Bgee	Human / Mouse (ortholog); Top expressed in: ventricular zone; ganglionic eminence; spinal ganglia; retinal pigment epithelium; superior vestibular nucleus; caudate nucleus; pons; putamen; nucleus accumbens; trigeminal ganglion / Top expressed in: pontine nuclei; olfactory epithelium; deep cerebellar nuclei; vestibular sensory epithelium; lower lip; lobe of cerebellum; cerebellar vermis; medial vestibular nucleus; mammillary body; ventral tegmental area; More reference expression data
BioGPS	n/a
Orthologs
Databases	NCBI: entry; OMA: entry
Species	Human	Mouse
Entrez	57633	16979
Ensembl	ENSG00000175928	ENSMUSG00000034648
UniProt	Q6UXK5	Q61809
RefSeq (mRNA)	NM_020873; NM_001324188; NM_001324189	NM_008516
RefSeq (protein)	NP_001311117; NP_001311118; NP_065924	NP_032542
Location (UCSC)	Chr 3: 3.8 – 3.85 Mb	Chr 6: 107.51 – 107.55 Mb
PubMed search
- Wikidata
View/Edit Human	View/Edit Mouse

Leucine-rich repeat neuronal protein 1 is a protein that in humans is encoded by the LRRN1 gene.
