= PTPRH =

Protein-coding gene in the species Homo sapiens

Identifiers
- Aliases: PTPRH, R-PTP-H, SAP1, protein tyrosine phosphatase, receptor type H, protein tyrosine phosphatase receptor type H
- External IDs: OMIM: 602510; MGI: 3026877; GeneCards: PTPRH
Enzyme activity
EC #	BRENDA	ExPASy	KEGG	MetaCyc
3.1.3.48	↗	↗	↗	↗

Gene location (Human)
Chr.	Chromosome 19 (human)
Band	19q13.42	Start	55,181,247 bp
Band	19q13.42	End	55,209,506 bp

Gene location (Mouse)
Chr.	Chromosome 7 (mouse)
Band	7|7 A1	Start	4,551,611 bp
Band	7|7 A1	End	4,607,040 bp
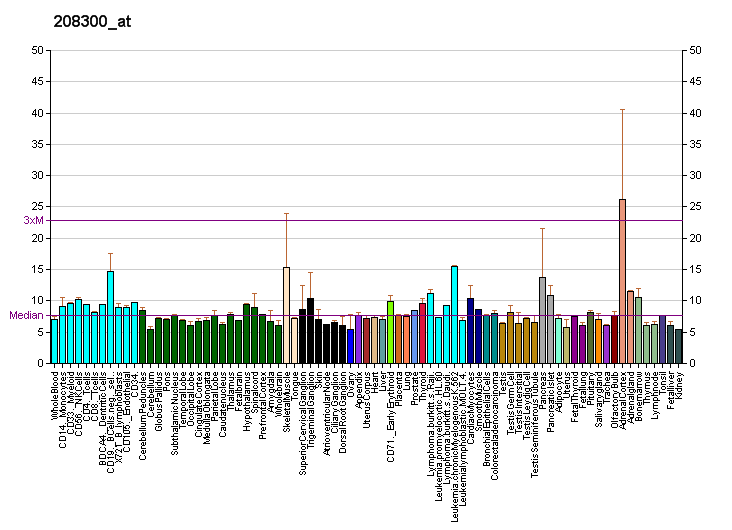
RNA expression pattern
Bgee	Human / Mouse (ortholog); Top expressed in: jejunal mucosa; duodenum; pancreatic ductal cell; mucosa of transverse colon; gallbladder; mucosa of ileum; rectum; islet of Langerhans; oocyte; spleen / Top expressed in: jejunum; ileum; colon; duodenum; stomach; striatum of neuraxis; superior frontal gyrus; cerebellar cortex; primary visual cortex; hypothalamus; More reference expression data
BioGPS	More reference expression data
Gene ontology
Molecular function	protein tyrosine phosphatase activity; phosphatase activity; transmembrane receptor protein tyrosine phosphatase activity; protein binding; phosphoprotein phosphatase activity; hydrolase activity
Cellular component	cytoplasm; integral component of membrane; integral component of plasma membrane; membrane; plasma membrane; microvillus; apical plasma membrane; microvillus membrane; cell projection
Biological process	protein dephosphorylation; dephosphorylation; apoptotic process; peptidyl-tyrosine dephosphorylation
Sources:Amigo / QuickGO
Orthologs
Databases	NCBI: entry; OMA: entry
Species	Human	Mouse
Entrez	5794	545902
Ensembl	ENSG00000080031	ENSMUSG00000035429
UniProt	Q9HD43	E9Q0N2
RefSeq (mRNA)	NM_001161440; NM_002842	NM_207270
RefSeq (protein)	NP_001154912; NP_002833	NP_997153
Location (UCSC)	Chr 19: 55.18 – 55.21 Mb	Chr 7: 4.55 – 4.61 Mb
PubMed search
- Wikidata
View/Edit Human	View/Edit Mouse

Receptor-type tyrosine-protein phosphatase H is an enzyme that in humans is encoded by the PTPRH gene.

The protein encoded by this gene is a member of the protein tyrosine phosphatase (PTP) family. PTPs are known to be signaling molecules that regulate a variety of cellular processes including cell growth, differentiation, mitotic cycle, and oncogenic transformation. This PTP possesses an extracellular region, a single transmembrane region, and a single intracytoplasmic catalytic domain, and thus represents a receptor-type PTP. The extracellular region contains eight fibronectin type III-like repeats and multiple N-glycosylation sites. The gene was shown to be expressed primarily in brain and liver, and at a lower level in heart and stomach. It was also found to be expressed in several cancer cell lines, but not in the corresponding normal tissues.
