= PTPRJ =

Protein-coding gene in the species Homo sapiens

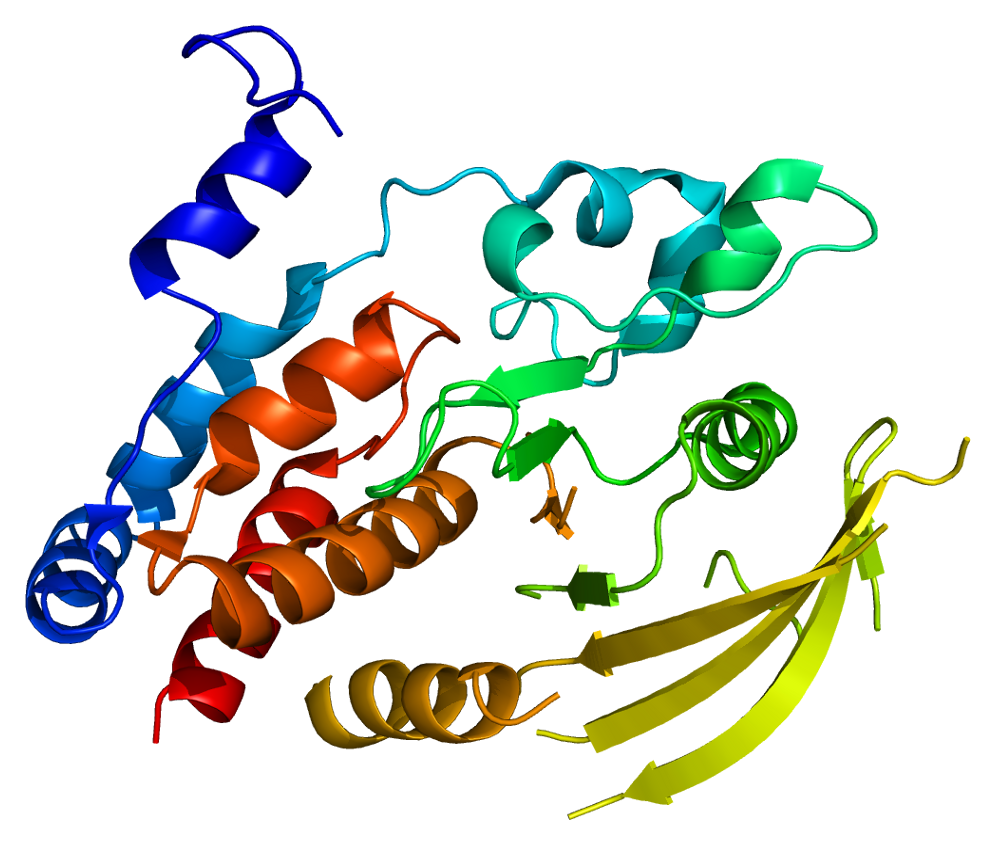

Identifiers
- Aliases: PTPRJ, CD148, DEP1, HPTPeta, R-PTP-ETA, SCC1, protein tyrosine phosphatase, receptor type J, protein tyrosine phosphatase receptor type J, R-PTP-J, HPTP eta
- External IDs: OMIM: 600925; MGI: 104574; GeneCards: PTPRJ
Available structures
PDB	Ortholog search: PDBe RCSB
PDB	List of PDB id codes 2CFV, 2DLE, 2NZ6
Enzyme activity
EC #	BRENDA	ExPASy	KEGG	MetaCyc
3.1.3.48	↗	↗	↗	↗

Gene location (Human)
Chr.	Chromosome 11 (human)
Band	11p11.2	Start	47,980,559 bp
Band	11p11.2	End	48,170,839 bp

Gene location (Mouse)
Chr.	Chromosome 2 (mouse)
Band	2 E1|2 50.19 cM	Start	90,260,098 bp
Band	2 E1|2 50.19 cM	End	90,410,991 bp
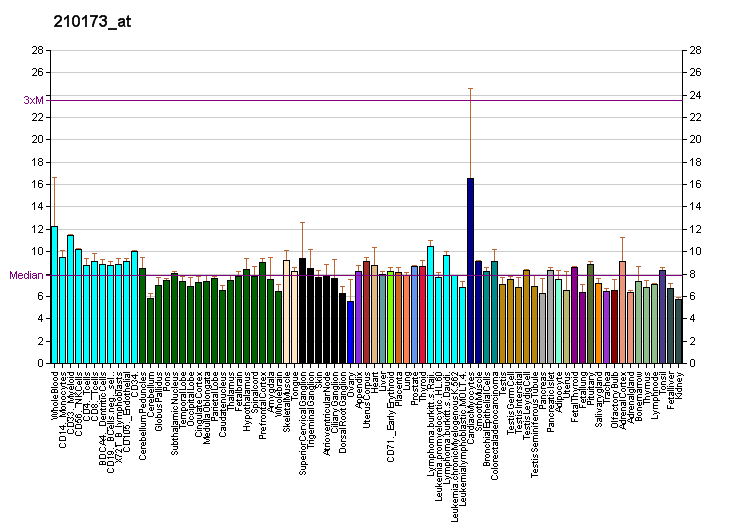
RNA expression pattern
Bgee	Human / Mouse (ortholog); Top expressed in: mucosa of ileum; white blood cell; monocyte; blood; parotid gland; renal medulla; pylorus; bone marrow cell; palpebral conjunctiva; jejunal mucosa / Top expressed in: stroma of bone marrow; granulocyte; olfactory tubercle; dentate gyrus; primary motor cortex; lateral geniculate nucleus; piriform cortex; ascending aorta; dentate gyrus of hippocampal formation granule cell; lumbar subsegment of spinal cord; More reference expression data
BioGPS	More reference expression data
Gene ontology
Molecular function	beta-catenin binding; phosphoprotein phosphatase activity; gamma-catenin binding; phosphatase activity; delta-catenin binding; mitogen-activated protein kinase binding; platelet-derived growth factor receptor binding; protein binding; hydrolase activity; protein kinase binding; protein tyrosine phosphatase activity
Cellular component	integral component of membrane; cell projection; membrane; cell-cell junction; plasma membrane; integral component of plasma membrane; ruffle membrane; cell surface; cell junction; immunological synapse; extracellular exosome; specific granule membrane
Biological process	negative regulation of platelet-derived growth factor receptor signaling pathway; negative regulation of protein kinase B signaling; positive regulation of protein kinase B signaling; negative regulation of epidermal growth factor receptor signaling pathway; protein dephosphorylation; contact inhibition; negative regulation of T cell receptor signaling pathway; regulation of cell adhesion; negative regulation of cell migration; negative regulation of MAP kinase activity; negative regulation of cell growth; positive regulation of focal adhesion assembly; platelet-derived growth factor receptor signaling pathway; positive chemotaxis; peptidyl-tyrosine dephosphorylation; T cell receptor signaling pathway; negative regulation of cell population proliferation; negative regulation of vascular permeability; positive regulation of cell adhesion; dephosphorylation; neutrophil degranulation; B cell differentiation; positive regulation of tumor necrosis factor production; calcium-mediated signaling using intracellular calcium source; positive regulation of MAPK cascade; positive regulation of peptidyl-tyrosine phosphorylation; positive regulation of Fc-gamma receptor signaling pathway involved in phagocytosis
Sources:Amigo / QuickGO
Orthologs
Databases	NCBI: entry; OMA: entry
Species	Human	Mouse
Entrez	5795	19271
Ensembl	ENSG00000149177	ENSMUSG00000025314
UniProt	Q12913	Q64455
RefSeq (mRNA)	NM_001098503; NM_002843	NM_001135657; NM_008982
RefSeq (protein)	NP_001091973; NP_002834	NP_001129129; NP_033008
Location (UCSC)	Chr 11: 47.98 – 48.17 Mb	Chr 2: 90.26 – 90.41 Mb
PubMed search
- Wikidata
View/Edit Human	View/Edit Mouse

Receptor-type tyrosine-protein phosphatase eta is an enzyme that in humans is encoded by the PTPRJ gene.

== Function ==
The protein encoded by this gene is a member of the protein tyrosine phosphatase (PTP) family. PTPs are known to be signaling molecules that regulate a variety of cellular processes including cell growth, differentiation, mitotic cycle, and oncogenic transformation. This PTP possesses an extracellular region containing five fibronectin type III repeats, a single transmembrane region, and a single intracytoplasmic catalytic domain, and thus represents a receptor-type PTP. This PTP is present in all hematopoietic lineages, and was shown to negatively regulate T cell receptor signaling possibly through interfering with the phosphorylation of Phospholipase C Gamma 1 (PLCG1) and Linker for Activation of T Cells (LAT). This PTP was also found to dephosphorylate PDGF beta receptor, and may be involved in UV-induced signal transduction.

== Interactions ==
PTPRJ has been shown to interact with CTNND1.
