= ACSL =

ACSL may refer to:

- American Computer Science League, a computer science competition primarily among US high school students
- Advanced Continuous Simulation Language, a computer language
- ANSI/ISO C Specification Language, a formal specification language for C programs
- Association of School and College Leaders, a British professional association
- Human genes encoding Acyl-CoA synthetase long-chain enzymes:
  - ACSL1
  - ACSL3
  - ACSL4
  - ACSL5
  - ACSL6
  - SLC27A2
- The Anti-Capitalist Software License
