= ACSL4 =

Protein-coding gene in humans

Identifiers
- Aliases: ACSL4, ACS4, FACL4, LACS4, MRX63, MRX68, acyl-CoA synthetase long-chain family member 4, acyl-CoA synthetase long chain family member 4, XLID63
- External IDs: OMIM: 300157; MGI: 1354713; GeneCards: ACSL4
Enzyme activity
EC #	BRENDA	ExPASy	KEGG	MetaCyc
6.2.1.3	↗	↗	↗	↗
6.2.1.15	↗	↗	↗	↗

Gene location (Human)
Chr.	X chromosome (human)
Band	Xq23	Start	109,624,244 bp
Band	Xq23	End	109,733,403 bp

Gene location (Mouse)
Chr.	X chromosome (mouse)
Band	X|X F2	Start	141,100,989 bp
Band	X|X F2	End	141,173,531 bp
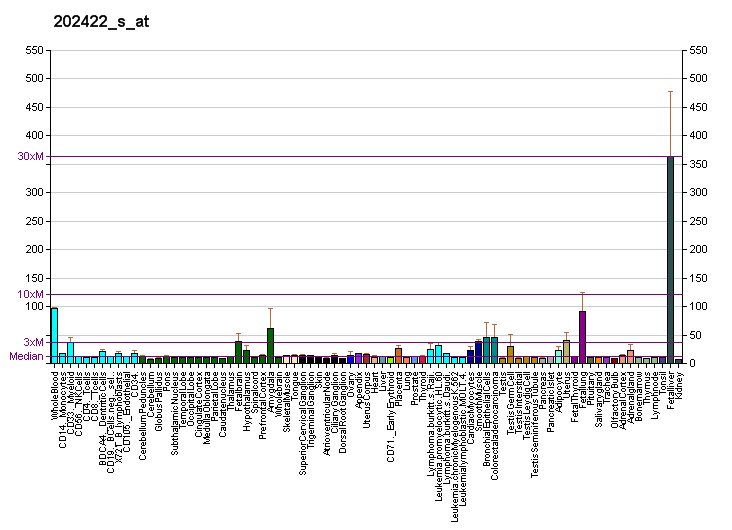
RNA expression pattern
Bgee	Human / Mouse (ortholog); Top expressed in: monocyte; epithelium of colon; Achilles tendon; right adrenal gland; left adrenal gland; right adrenal cortex; islet of Langerhans; gallbladder; left adrenal cortex; right lung / Top expressed in: adrenal gland; gastrula; cumulus cell; left lung lobe; barrel cortex; medial dorsal nucleus; seminal vesicula; ventral tegmental area; decidua; anterior amygdaloid area; More reference expression data
BioGPS	More reference expression data
Gene ontology
Molecular function	nucleotide binding; arachidonate-CoA ligase activity; ligase activity; catalytic activity; very long-chain fatty acid-CoA ligase activity; ATP binding; decanoate-CoA ligase activity; long-chain fatty acid-CoA ligase activity
Cellular component	cytoplasm; organelle membrane; integral component of membrane; mitochondria associated membranes; endoplasmic reticulum membrane; membrane; mitochondrial membranes; intracellular membrane-bounded organelle; lipid droplet; peroxisomal membrane; peroxisome; mitochondrial outer membrane; soma; endoplasmic reticulum; mitochondrion; extracellular exosome
Biological process	response to interleukin-15; lipid biosynthetic process; response to nutrient; lipid metabolism; fatty acid transport; fatty acid metabolic process; embryonic process involved in female pregnancy; dendritic spine development; positive regulation of cell growth; long-chain fatty-acyl-CoA biosynthetic process; negative regulation of prostaglandin secretion; neuron differentiation; metabolism; triglyceride metabolic process; long-chain fatty acid metabolic process; triglyceride biosynthetic process
Sources:Amigo / QuickGO
Orthologs
Databases	NCBI: entry; OMA: entry
Species	Human	Mouse
Entrez	2182	50790
Ensembl	ENSG00000068366	ENSMUSG00000031278
UniProt	O60488	Q9QUJ7
RefSeq (mRNA)	NM_004458; NM_022977; NM_001318509; NM_001318510	NM_001033600; NM_019477; NM_207625
RefSeq (protein)	NP_001305438; NP_001305439; NP_004449; NP_075266	NP_001028772; NP_062350; NP_997508
Location (UCSC)	Chr X: 109.62 – 109.73 Mb	Chr X: 141.1 – 141.17 Mb
PubMed search
- Wikidata
View/Edit Human	View/Edit Mouse

Long-chain-fatty-acid—CoA ligase 4 is an enzyme that in humans is encoded by the ACSL4 gene.

The protein encoded by this gene is an isozyme of the long-chain fatty-acid-coenzyme A ligase family. Although differing in substrate specificity, subcellular localization, and tissue distribution, all isozymes of this family convert free long-chain fatty acids into fatty acyl-CoA esters, and thereby play a key role in lipid biosynthesis and fatty acid degradation. This isozyme preferentially utilizes arachidonate as substrate. The absence of this enzyme may contribute to the intellectual disability or Alport syndrome. Alternative splicing of this gene generates 2 transcript variants.

== Structure ==
The gene contains 18 exons. ACSL4 encodes a 74.4 kDa protein, FACL4, which is composed of 670 amino acids; 17 peptides have been observed through mass spectrometry data.

== Function ==
Fatty acid-CoA ligase 4 (FACL4), the protein encoded by the ACSL4 gene, is an acyl-CoA synthetase, which is an essential class of lipid metabolism enzymes, and ACSL4 is distinguished by its preference for arachidonic acid (AA). The enzyme controls the level of this fatty acid in cells; because AA is known to induce apoptosis (cell specific), the enzyme modulates apoptosis. Overexpression of ACSL4 results in a higher rate of arachidonoyl-CoA synthesis, increased 20:4 incorporation into phosphatidylethanolamine, phosphatidylinositol, and triacylglycerol, and reduced cellular levels of unesterified 20:4. Additionally, ACSL4 regulates PGE_{2} release from human smooth muscle cells. ACSL4 may regulate a number of processes dependent on the release of arachidonic acid-derived lipid mediators in the arterial wall.

== Clinical significance ==
The most common SNP (C to T substitution) in the first intron of the FACL4 gene is associated with altered FA composition of plasma phosphatidylcholines in patients with Metabolic Syndrome. It has been implicated in many mechanisms of carcinogenesis and neuronal development.

=== Cancer ===
In breast cancer, ACSL4 can serve as both a biomarker for and mediator of an aggressive breast cancer phenotype. ACSL4 also is positively correlated with a unique subtype of triple negative breast cancer (TNBC), which is characterized by the absence of androgen receptor (AR) and therefore referred to as quadruple negative breast cancer (QNBC).

The encoded protein FACL4 also plays a role in the growth of hepatic cancer cells. Inhibiting FACL4 leads to inhibition of human liver tumor cells, as marked by an increased level of apoptosis. It has also been suggested that modulation of FACL4 expression/activity is an approach for treatment of hepatic cell carcinoma (HCC).

The FACL4 pathway is also important in colon carcinogenesis; the development of selective inhibitors for FACL4 may be a worthy effort in the prevention and treatment of colon cancer. FACL4 up-regulation appears to occur during the transformation from the cancer from adenoma to adenocarcinoma. Additionally, some colon tumor promoters significantly induced FACL4 expression.

=== Neuronal development ===
FACL4 was the gene shown to be involved in nonspecific intellectual disability and fatty-acid metabolism. Since the ASCL4 gene is highly expressed in brain, where it encodes a brain specific isoform, a FACL4 mutation may be an efficient diagnostic tool in intellectually disabled males. FACL4 was discovered to be deleted in a family with Alport syndrome and elliptocytosis.

== Interactions ==
ACSL4 expression is regulated by SHP2 activity. Additionally, ACSL4 interacts with ACSL3, APP, DSE, ELAVL1, HECW2, MINOS1, PARK2, SPG20, SUMO2, TP53, TUBGCP3, UBC, UBD, and YWHAQ.
