= ACSL1 =

Protein-coding gene in the species Homo sapiens

Identifiers
- Aliases: ACSL1, ACS1, FACL1, FACL2, LACS, LACS1, LACS2, acyl-CoA synthetase long-chain family member 1, acyl-CoA synthetase long chain family member 1
- External IDs: OMIM: 152425; MGI: 102797; HomoloGene: 37561; GeneCards: ACSL1; OMA:ACSL1 - orthologs

Gene location (Human)
Chr.	Chromosome 4 (human)
Band	4q35.1	Start	184,755,595 bp
Band	4q35.1	End	184,826,818 bp

Gene location (Mouse)
Chr.	Chromosome 8 (mouse)
Band	8|8 B1.1	Start	46,924,074 bp
Band	8|8 B1.1	End	46,989,088 bp
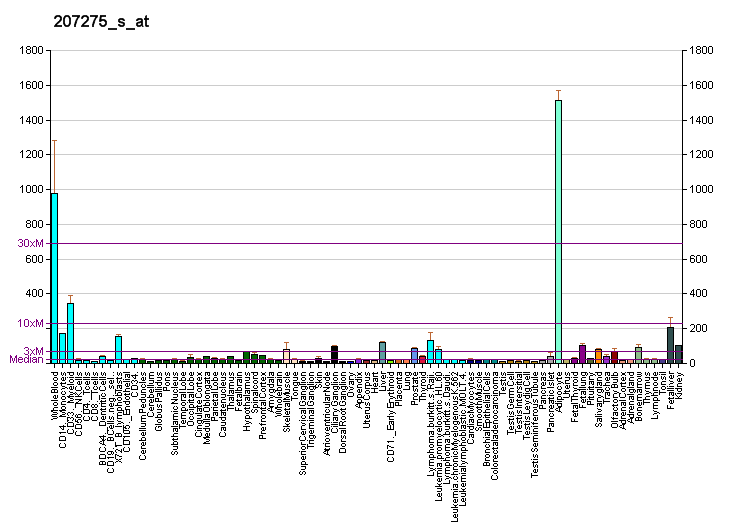

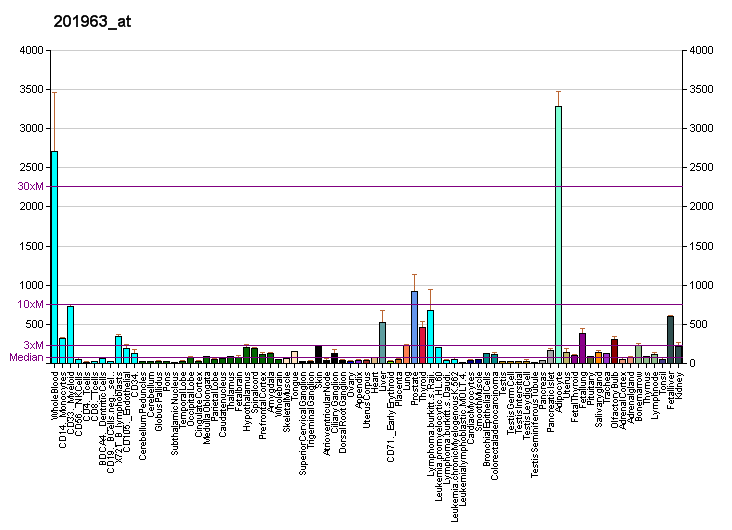
RNA expression pattern
Bgee	Human / Mouse (ortholog); Top expressed in: right lobe of liver; skin of thigh; blood; renal medulla; gastrocnemius muscle; adipose tissue; parotid gland; Skeletal muscle tissue of biceps brachii; skin of arm; pericardium / Top expressed in: brown adipose tissue; tunica adventitia of aorta; subcutaneous adipose tissue; myocardium of ventricle; intercostal muscle; left lobe of liver; white adipose tissue; right ventricle; digastric muscle; sternocleidomastoid muscle; More reference expression data
BioGPS	More reference expression data
Gene ontology
Molecular function	long-chain fatty acid-CoA ligase activity; nucleotide binding; ligase activity; catalytic activity; ATP binding; decanoate-CoA ligase activity
Cellular component	organelle membrane; integral component of membrane; endoplasmic reticulum membrane; membrane; intracellular membrane-bounded organelle; plasma membrane; peroxisomal membrane; peroxisome; mitochondrial outer membrane; mitochondrion; endoplasmic reticulum
Biological process	linoleic acid metabolic process; lipid biosynthetic process; xenobiotic catabolic process; response to organic cyclic compound; response to nutrient; lipid metabolism; alpha-linolenic acid metabolic process; fatty acid transport; response to organic substance; adiponectin-activated signaling pathway; fatty acid metabolic process; positive regulation of protein serine/threonine kinase activity; long-chain fatty-acyl-CoA biosynthetic process; long-chain fatty acid import into cell; metabolism; long-chain fatty acid metabolic process; triglyceride metabolic process; response to oleic acid; regulation of lipid metabolic process; triglyceride biosynthetic process; positive regulation of cold-induced thermogenesis
Sources:Amigo / QuickGO
Orthologs
Species	Human	Mouse
Entrez	2180	14081
Ensembl	ENSG00000151726	ENSMUSG00000018796
UniProt	P33121	P41216
RefSeq (mRNA)	NM_001286708; NM_001286710; NM_001286711; NM_001286712; NM_001995	NM_007981; NM_001302163
RefSeq (protein)	NP_001273637; NP_001273639; NP_001273640; NP_001986; NP_001368806 NP_001368807; NP_001368808; NP_001368809; NP_001368810; NP_001368811; NP_001368812; NP_001368813; NP_001368814; NP_001368815; NP_001368816; NP_001368817; NP_001368818; NP_001368819	NP_001289092; NP_032007
Location (UCSC)	Chr 4: 184.76 – 184.83 Mb	Chr 8: 46.92 – 46.99 Mb
PubMed search
- Wikidata
View/Edit Human	View/Edit Mouse

Long-chain-fatty-acid—CoA ligase 1 is an enzyme that in humans is encoded by the ACSL1 gene.

== Structure ==
=== Gene ===
The ACSL1 gene is located on the 4th chromosome, with its specific location being 4q35.1. The gene contains 28 exons.

In melanocytic cells ACSL1 gene expression may be regulated by MITF.

== Function ==
The protein encoded by this gene is an isozyme of the long-chain fatty-acid-coenzyme A ligase family. Although differing in substrate specificity, subcellular localization, and tissue distribution, all isozymes of this family convert free long-chain fatty acids into fatty acyl-CoA esters, and thereby play a key role in lipid biosynthesis and fatty acid degradation. Several transcript variants encoding different isoforms have been found for this gene. This specific protein is most commonly found in mitochondria and peroxisomes.

== Clinical significance ==
ACSL1 is known to be involved in fatty-acid metabolism critical for heart function and nonspecific intellectual disability. Since the ACSL4 gene is highly expressed in brain, where it encodes a brain specific isoform, an ASCL1 mutation may be an efficient diagnostic tool in intellectually disabled males.

== Interactions ==
ACSL1 expression is regulated by SHP2 activity. Additionally, ACSL1 interacts with ACSL3, APP, DSE, ELAVL1, HECW2, MINOS1, PARK2, SPG20, SUMO2, TP53, TUBGCP3, UBC, UBD, and YWHAQ.
