= Epsilon cell =

Type of hormone-producing cell

Details
- Location: Islets of Langerhans
- Function: Ghrelin production

Identifiers
- TH: H3.04.02.0.00038

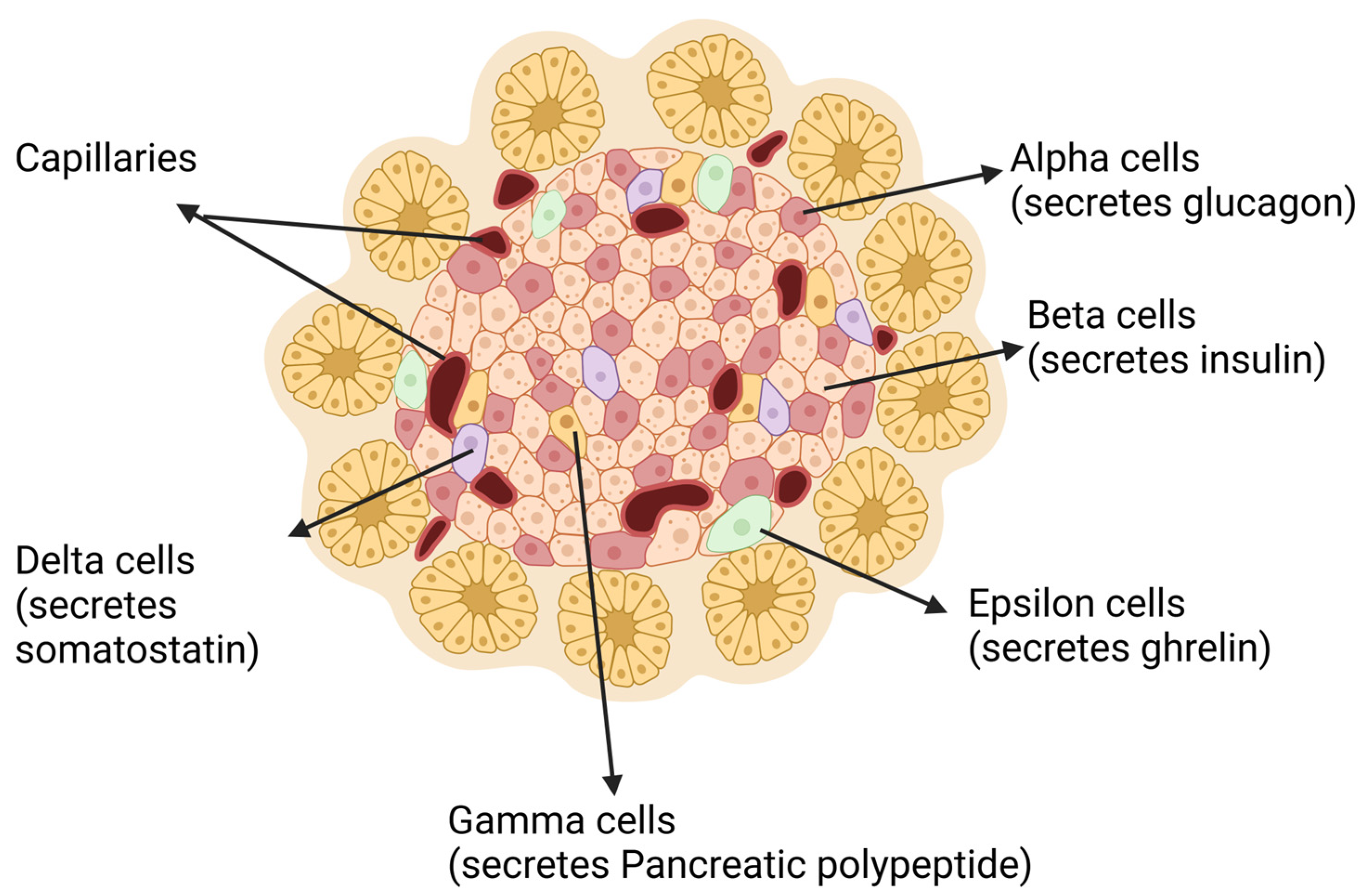
A schematic representation of various cell types within the pancreatic islet.

Epsilon cells (ε-cells) are one of the five types of endocrine cells found in regions of the pancreas called Islets of Langerhans. Epsilon cells produce the hormone ghrelin that induces hunger. They were first discovered in mice. In humans, these cells compose less than 1% of all islet cells. They are connected by tight junctions that allow impermeability to water-soluble compounds.

== Discovery ==
Researchers investigating pancreatic islets in mice compared normal mice pancreatic tissue during development to that of knockout mice. They found that a normal mouse pancreas includes a population of ghrelin-producing cells. Before further investigation took place, it was thought that Nkx2.2 and Pax4 genes promote cell differentiation of β-cells, but in their absence they instead form ε-cells. This was later confirmed by the findings that in the absence of both Nkx2.2 and Pax4 genes, β-cells fail to form and are replaced by ε-cells. Overall, the findings were that there is a population of ghrelin-producing ε-cells in the mouse pancreas, and that knockout of insulin-producing β-cells leads to an enormous amount of ε-cells. The cells are round or oval in shape and usually in the perimeter of the islets, sometimes with cytoplasmic extensions. ε-cells have also been proposed to be from a similar cell lineage to both α-cells and β-cells, but have been found to be more closely related to α-cells. ε-cells have been found in pancreas of Xenopus frogs, cat fish, and zebrafish among other animals. This suggests that this islet cell is evolutionarily conserved. A separate study used In situ hybridization for ghrelin mRNA and similarly concluded that there is a separate, previously unrecognised, islet cell population that are the ε-cells. Researchers are hopeful that their novel knowledge on ghrelin-producing ε-cells will aid in therapeutic treatment to block formation of ε-cells, which could potentially block a cellular cascade that could aid in treatment of Type II Diabetes. These islet cells are also being studied in pancreatic cancer, where it is hoped that they can act as markers to previously silent tumors.

== Epsilon cells during development ==
In human fetal pancreases, single ε-cells scatter in primitive exocrine tissue and are observed to start aggregating into clusters after gestational week 13. Peak ghrelin levels are observed at week 14 of gestation. From gestational week 21, ε-cells are observed around developing islets in humans, forming an almost continuous layer at the rim of the islets. ε-cells are found centralized in the mouse fetal pancreas, with a few also observed in the stomach. These results in mice pancreas were discovered and confirmed with the use of confocal microscopy, which is able to collect images of thick specimens and exclude fluorescent areas outside of the focal plane. These islet cells are the main source of ghrelin during development. Ghrelin released from ε-cells have been found to promote cell growth and proliferation while also inhibiting apoptosis of pancreatic beta cells in the human pancreas. Some ε-cells express cytokeratin 20, a marker of duct cells and islet precursor cells, hinting that these islet cells originate from the ductal epithelium. The development of these cells derive from the Ngn3 transcription factor. Mice with mutant Nkx2.2 genes show an increase of ε-cells. On a cellular level, ε-cells co-produce both NKX2-2 and ISL1, but not NKS6-1 and PAX6 as was previously hypothesized. Furthermore, this type of cell co-produces ISL1 which plays a role in the development of the mesenchyme of the dorsal pancreatic bud, and the differentiation of the dorsal pancreatic epithelium into endocrine cells. A total of 36 genes are significantly enriched in ε-cells that aid in proteinase inhibition, processing of hormones, cell migration, and immune activity that differentiates them from α-, β-, δ- and PP-cells. Additionally, the secretory vesicles of ε-cells (110±3 nm) are much smaller than those of α-cells (185±7 nm). Unlike the other pancreatic islet cells, ε-cells also do not produce other pancreatic hormones (insulin, glucagon, homeostatic) and they do not express the CART peptide. Examples of specific genes that influence ε-cells are acyl-coenzyme A synthetase long chain family member 1 (ACSL1) and defensin beta 1. ACSL1 is thought to play a role in the processing of ghrelin while defensin beta 1 produces a protein that can kill bacteria, viruses, and yeast to regulate immunity. After birth, the number of ε-cells decrease and become rare into adulthood. Studies in mice, desert gerbil, and African ice rats have all yielded closely related results on this topic.

== Epsilon cells in adults ==
Humans are the only species known to keep ghrelin-producing ε-cells in the pancreas into adulthood. As a result, there are difficulties to study this cell type in adults since it can only be observed in the human pancreas. During the weeks 15-26 of the fetus during development, ε-cells compose about 10% of the islet cells, but following birth, their composition decreases to only 1% of adult islet cells. Estimates of the average number of ε-cells per islet in adults vary in number with differing results. One study found that there are about 3 to 5 ε-cells present in each islet of the adult pancreas, which includes a total of about 1,000 islets. Another study observed an average of 12±1.2 ε-cells per islet. In adult pancreas samples, they are observed to be round or oval shaped and remain localized on the mantle of the islets in different amounts, both in clusters and or single cells. In mice, ε-cells are present in the pancreatic islets and stomach during development, but are found strictly in the stomach after birth. In both humans and mice, results have varied on whether or not ghrelin is co-localized with other hormones in stages of adulthood or development. Because of the scarcity of ε-cells in an adult pancreas, it is predicted that they do not continue to produce large amounts of ghrelin that circulates throughout the body. The human adult pancreas has an ε-cell composition of about 0.13 grams. Sex and age do not affect the average number of ε-cells in islets. However, an inverse relationship between BMI and number of ε-cells is noted: as body weight increases, ε-cells decrease in number. Loss of these cells due to increase in BMI leads to an increase in insulin secretion, and increased risk of apoptosis and inflammation in pancreatic islets. Cell membrane receptors in adult ε-cells include short-chained fatty acid receptor FFAR3, G protein–coupled bile acid receptor 1 (GPCR), interferon-α and interferon-β receptor subunit 1, interferon-γ receptor 2, a receptor known for its regulation of immunoglobulin G uptake, plasminogen receptor, and a CD320 receptor. The variety of receptors allow hormones, nutrients, lipids, and cytokine ligands to bind. The primary cellular metabolic pathway factor present in ε-cells are members that compose the fatty acid metabolism pathway, ACSL1. ACSL1 is an enzyme involved in the first step of fatty acid oxidation, and this pathway functions in this islet cell specifically to modify ghrelin acyl modification. Transcription factors that are necessary ε-cell maturation and preservation are numbered to a total of 366. The functions of each individual transcription factor have not yet been studied.

== See also ==
- List of human cell types derived from the germ layers
- Ghrelin and the endocrine system
- List of distinct cell types in the adult human body
