= EVA1C =

Transmembrane protein in human

Identifiers
- Aliases: EVA1C, B18, B19, C21orf63, C21orf64, FAM176C, SUE21, PRED34, eva-1 homolog C (C. elegans), eva-1 homolog C
- External IDs: MGI: 1918217; GeneCards: EVA1C

Gene location (Human)
Chr.	Chromosome 21 (human)
Band	21q22.11	Start	32,412,006 bp
Band	21q22.11	End	32,515,397 bp

Gene location (Mouse)
Chr.	Chromosome 16 (mouse)
Band	16|16 C3.3	Start	90,623,607 bp
Band	16|16 C3.3	End	90,701,997 bp
RNA expression pattern
Bgee	Human / Mouse (ortholog); Top expressed in: olfactory zone of nasal mucosa; left uterine tube; gastric mucosa; right uterine tube; body of uterus; parietal pleura; pancreatic ductal cell; decidua; tibial nerve; palpebral conjunctiva / Top expressed in: lumbar spinal ganglion; gastrula; decidua; hair follicle; spermatid; urethra; vestibular membrane of cochlear duct; ventricular zone; seminiferous tubule; main bronchus; More reference expression data
BioGPS	n/a
Gene ontology
Molecular function	carbohydrate binding; heparin binding
Cellular component	membrane; integral component of membrane; extracellular region
Biological process	biological process
Sources:Amigo / QuickGO
Orthologs
Databases	NCBI: entry; OMA: entry
Species	Human	Mouse
Entrez	59271	70967
Ensembl	ENSG00000166979	ENSMUSG00000039903
UniProt	P58658	P58659
RefSeq (mRNA)	NM_001286556; NM_058187; NM_001320744; NM_001320745	NM_001199210; NM_027627; NM_001316760; NM_001316761
RefSeq (protein)	NP_001273485; NP_001307673; NP_001307674; NP_478067	NP_001186139; NP_001303689; NP_001303690; NP_081903
Location (UCSC)	Chr 21: 32.41 – 32.52 Mb	Chr 16: 90.62 – 90.7 Mb
PubMed search
- Wikidata
View/Edit Human	View/Edit Mouse

EVA1C (Eva-1 Homolog C) is a transmembrane protein in humans (Homo sapiens) that is encoded by the EVA1C gene on chromosome 21. The EVA1C protein is thought to be involved in herapin binding activity. In addition, the gene is thought to be associated with diseases such as X-Linked Intellectual Disability-Short Stature-Overweight Syndrome.

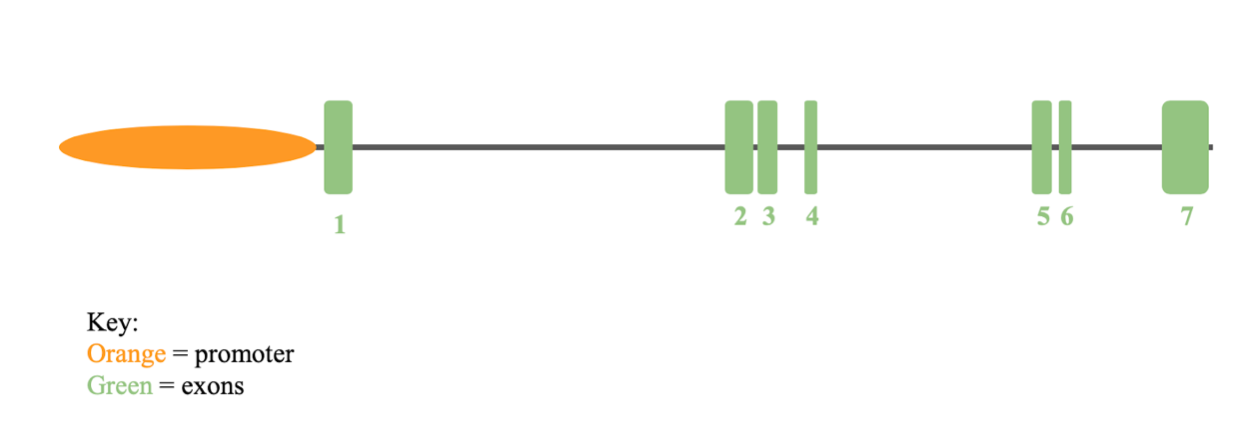
Bird’s eye view of EVA1C gene in humans (Homo sapiens) using UCSC BLAT. The orange oval indicates the promoter and the green regions represent the 7 exons.

== Gene ==
=== Aliases ===
B18, B19, C21orf63, C21orf64, FAM176C, PRED34, and SUE21 are aliases of the EVA1C gene.

=== Locus ===
EVA1C is located on the plus strand of chromosome 21 (21q22.11). The span of the EVA1C gene is 103,394 bases (chr21:33,784,314-33,887,707).

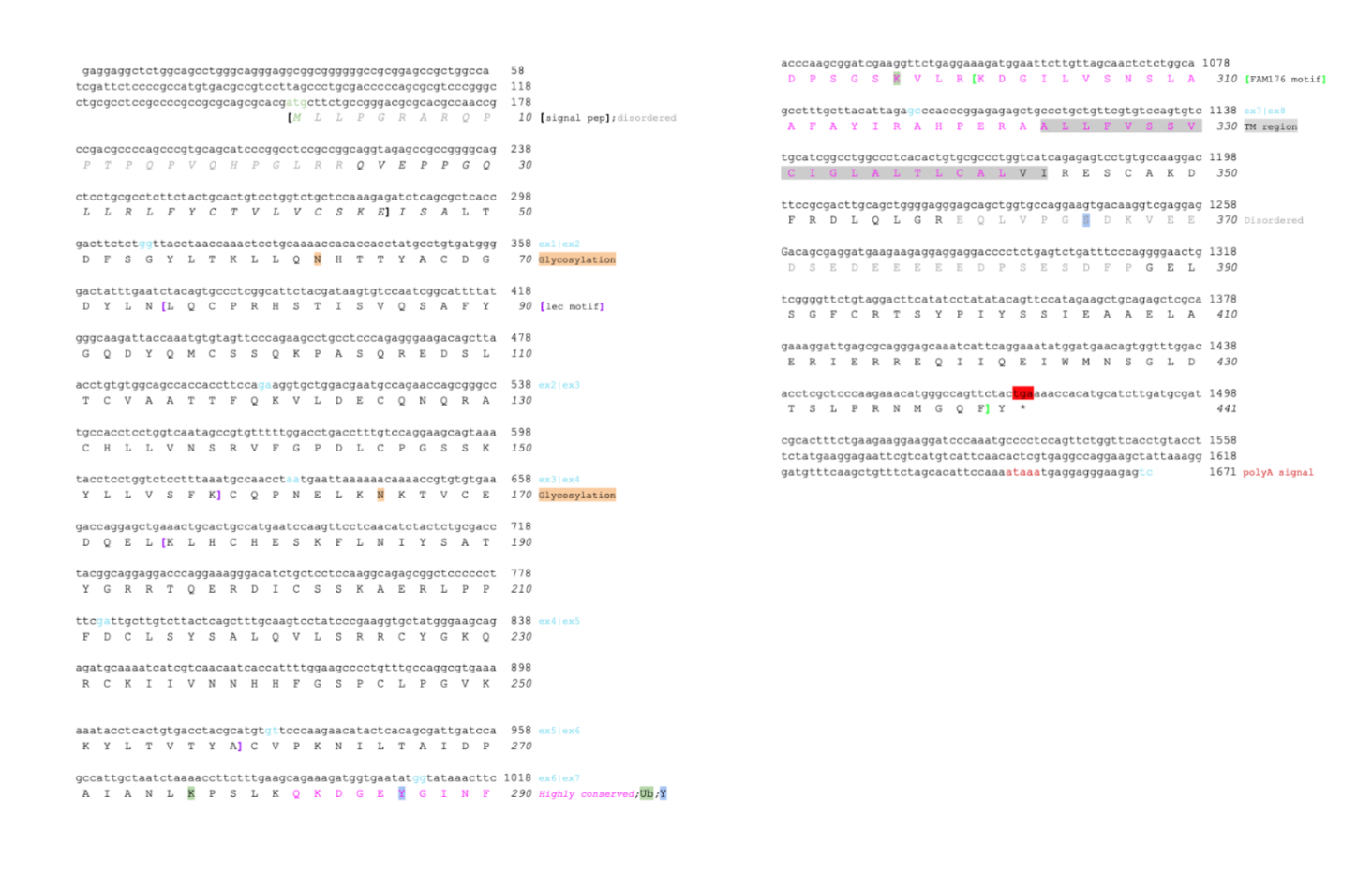
Conceptual translation of the EVA1C mRNA and protein sequences. Annotations are marked on both sequences. The specific annotations and what they represent can be found on the right-hand side of the translation. The pink amino acids represent a region that is highly conserved in EVA1C and its orthologs.

== RNA ==
=== Isoforms ===
EVA1C has 9 isoforms with EVA1C isoform X1 being the longest. This isoform is 441 amino acids in length.

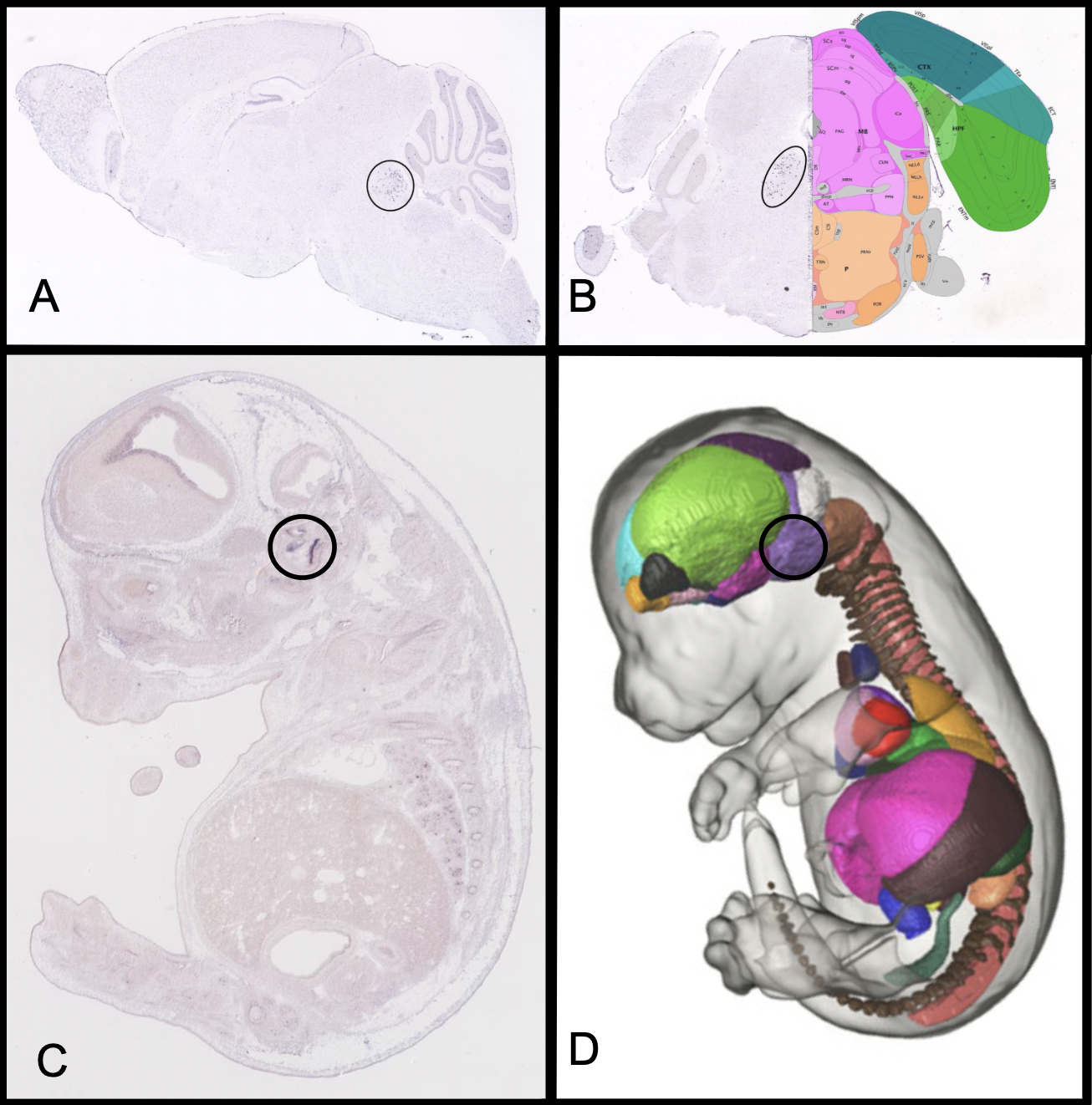
EVA1C expression in house mouse (Mus musculus) brain found using Allen Brain Atlas and Genepaint. (A) Sagittal slice of the brain. (B) Coronal slice of the brain. (C) Imaging of fetal house mouse. (D) Anatomy of fetal house mouse. The black circles represent where in the brain EVA1C is most highly expressed.

=== Expression ===
EVA1C RNA is most highly expressed in the prostate, lungs, uterus, and heart. It is also highly expressed in the human stomach at 20 weeks postnatal, whereas it is most highly expressed in the heart at 11 weeks postnatal. Overall, it seems as though EVA1C RNA is most highly expressed in respiratory organs along with male and female reproductive organs. EVA1C was found to be expressed at low levels in the brain. However, using Allen Brain Atlas, EVA1C was found to be most highly expressed in the periaqueductal gray region of the midbrain in the house mouse (Mus musculus) brain.

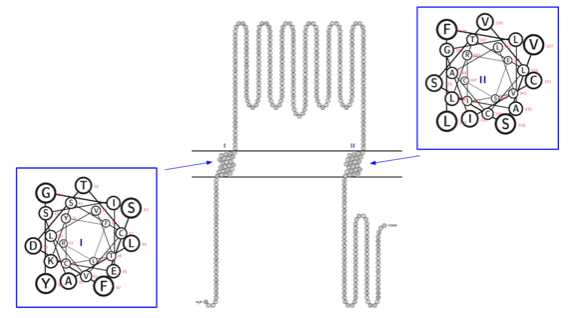
Snake-like plot of EVA1C with the wheel plot of transmembrane helices I and II found using PSORT II Prediction. Larger amino acids are closer to the C-terminus of the protein.

== Protein ==
=== Isoelectric point and molecular weight ===
The isoelectric point of the EVA1C protein in humans (Homo sapiens) is 6.5 pl and the molecular weight is 49 kDa. When comparing to its paralogs, EVA1A and EVA1B, EVA1C had the highest molecular weight and isoelectric point. This indicates that EVA1C is the largest protein.

=== Composition ===
The protein composition of EVA1C was found using EMBL-EBI SAPS. EVA1C consists of all 20 amino acids; with cysteine (C) being present in high amounts. The net charge of EVA1C was found to be lower than average. EVA1C has a negative charge cluster from 369 to 389 amino acids, which is where the disordered region is located. The transmembrane region was found to have a major hydrophobic region.

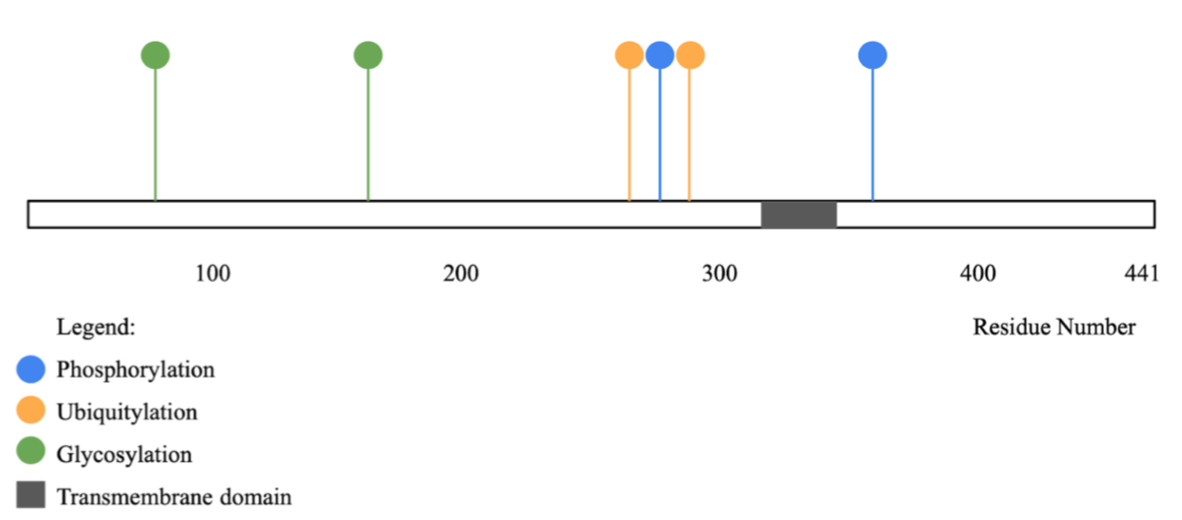
Post-translational modifications of the EVA1C protein founding us Phosphosite. The legend at the bottom left of the figure indicates which color represents which modification.

=== Regulation ===
EVA1C is predicted to have 6 post-translational modifications. Glycosylation can be found on the first half of the protein, while phosphorylation and ubiquitylation can be found on the second half of the protein. There are two of each type of post-translational modifications.

=== Interacting proteins ===
EVA1C has been shown to interact with AMN1, USE1, SLITRK3, ROBO3, FLRT3, DONSON, and POFUT2.

== Homology ==
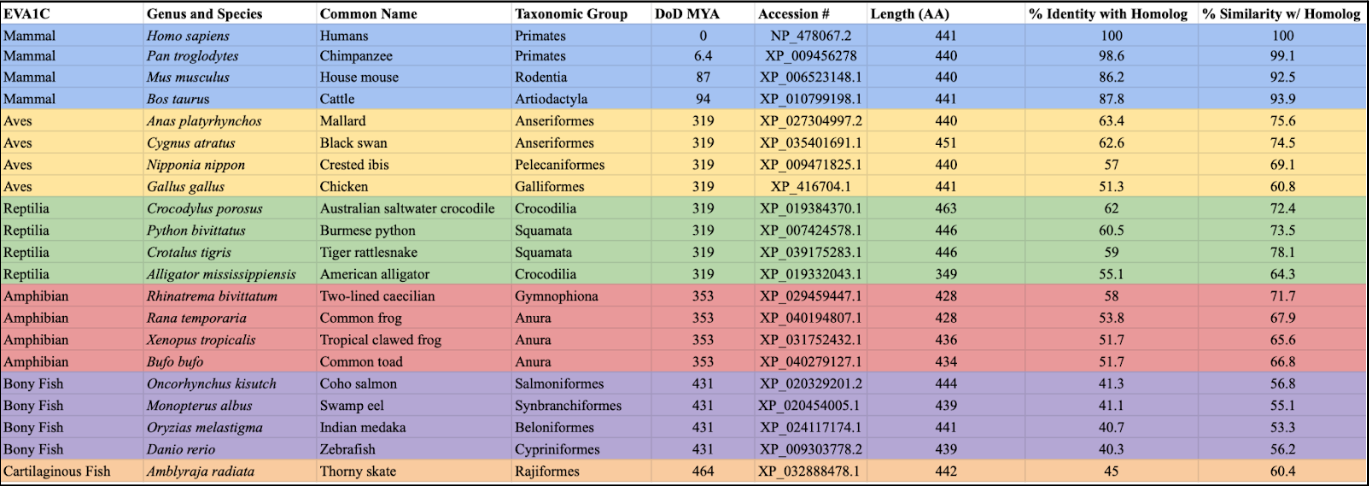
Ortholog sequences of EVA1C sorted by median date of divergence and sequence identity to human protein. The colors are used to group the species taxon.

=== Orthologs ===
The orthologs of EVA1C were found using NCBI Homologene and sorted by median date of divergence found using TimeTree and sequence identity to the human protein was found using the EMBOSS Needle Tool. The species that has the most distantly related EVA1C gene to humans is EVA1C in a cartilaginous fish called the thorny skate (Amblyraja radiata). The sequence identity of this species with humans is 45%. Mammals had an identity range of 87.8-98.6%, Aves had an identity range of 51.3-63.4%, Reptilia had an identity range of 55.1-62%, Amphibians had an identity range of 51.7-58%, and Bony Fish had an identity range of 40.3-41.3%.

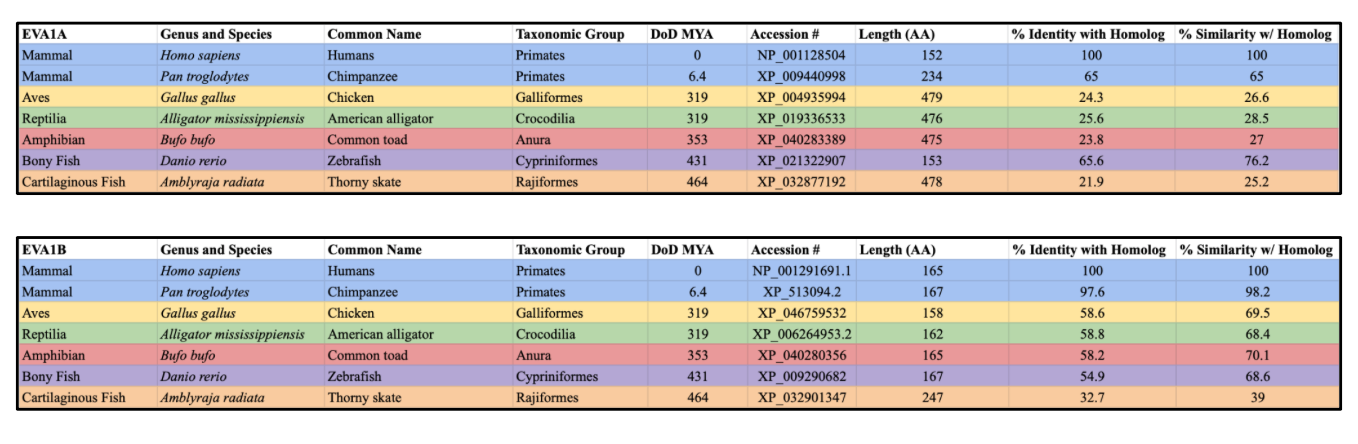
Ortholog sequences of EVA1A and EVA1B sorted by median date of divergence. The colors are used to group the species taxon.

=== Paralogs ===
The paralogs of EVA1C are EVA1A (Eva-1 Homolog A) and EVA1B (Eva-1 Homolog B). The thorny skate (Amblyraja radiata) was found to be the most distant ortholog in EVA1A, EVA1B, and EVA1C. The divergence time of humans and the thorny skate is 464 million years ago.

== Clinical significance ==
The EVA1C gene is located on the critical region of Down syndrome on chromosome 21. This syndrome is the result of individuals having an extra copy of chromosome 21. Neurological and muscle impairments are experienced by people with Down syndrome. An experiment that studied orthologs of chromosome 21 in roundworms (Caenorhabditis elegans) found that EVA1C was one of the orthologs that was required for neuromuscular behaviors. The results of this experiment indicate that the EVA1C is a gene that underlies the phenotypes of Down syndrome.
