= Spart =

Spart usually refers to

- A member of the International Communist League (Fourth Internationalist) also called the Spartacist League
- Dave Spart, absurd ultra-left-wing character satirised in Private Eye
- SPART, a gene that encodes the protein Spartin
