= Spartin =

Spartin may refer to:

- Peloursin, a grape variety
- A human protein encoded by the SPART gene
