= CFAP298 =

Protein-coding gene in humans

Identifiers
- Aliases: CFAP298, C21orf48, CILD26, FBB18, Kur, chromosome 21 open reading frame 59, C21orf59
- External IDs: OMIM: 615494; MGI: 1915251; GeneCards: CFAP298

Gene location (Mouse)
Chr.	Chromosome 16 (mouse)
Band	16|16 C3.3	Start	90,722,697 bp
Band	16|16 C3.3	End	90,732,002 bp
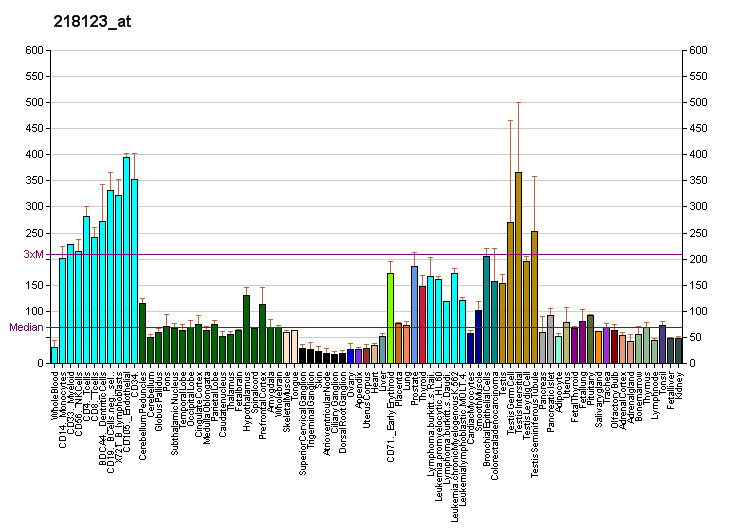
RNA expression pattern
Bgee	Human / Mouse (ortholog); n/a / Top expressed in: zygote; secondary oocyte; neural layer of retina; seminiferous tubule; spermatid; spermatocyte; primary oocyte; tail of embryo; muscle of thigh; choroidal fissure
BioGPS	More reference expression data
Gene ontology
Molecular function	protein binding
Cellular component	cytosol; cytoplasm; nucleus; cytoskeleton; cilium; cell projection
Biological process	cell projection morphogenesis; regulation of cilium movement; cilium assembly
Sources:Amigo / QuickGO
Orthologs
Databases	NCBI: entry; OMA: entry
Species	Human	Mouse
Entrez	56683	68001
Ensembl	ENSG00000159079	ENSMUSG00000022972
UniProt	P57076	Q8BL95
RefSeq (mRNA)	NM_017835; NM_021254	NM_026502
RefSeq (protein)	NP_067077; NP_001337263; NP_001337264; NP_001337265; NP_001337266	NP_080778
Location (UCSC)	n/a	Chr 16: 90.72 – 90.73 Mb
PubMed search
- Wikidata
View/Edit Human	View/Edit Mouse

Cilia- and flagella-associated protein 298 is a protein encoded by CFAP298 gene. It is of interest in part for its association with various diseases. It has been found in high levels in the bone marrow of patients with a negative prognosis of acute myeloid leukemia and an abnormal karyotype. Male Alzheimer's patients have shown a decrease in expression of CFAP298 in their blood cells. The CFAP298 gene lies within the critical region of Down syndrome. There are no clear paralogs in humans, but the gene has homologues widely conserved among animals, fungi, and algae.

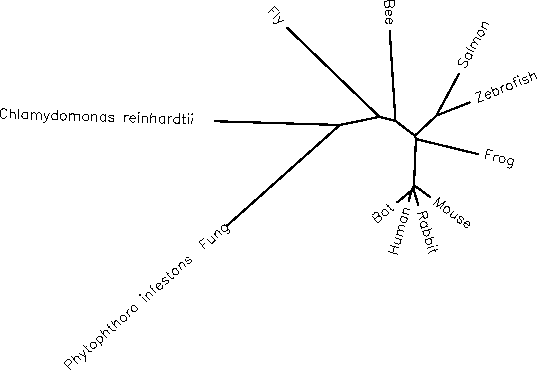
A phylogenetic tree showing the wide conservation c21orf59.

== Gene ==
CFAP298 is a gene found on the 21st chromosome at 21q22.1. A total of thirteen splice variants have been found, but only eleven protein-coding ones. The most common form of CFAP298 mRNA has 1427 base pairs broken into seven exons. Its closest neighbors on the chromosome are TCP10L, EVA1C, LOC100506185, OR7E23P, and SYNJ1.

=== Gene Expression ===
The CFAP298 primary sequence is found in high quantity in most tissues. Some tissues with notable less expression are the ganglions, the heart, and the liver. It is suspected CFAP298 is found in the brain early in development due to the two achaete-scute complex homologue transcription factor binding sites found in the promoter.

== Protein ==
The CFAP298 primary sequence consists of 290 amino acids with mass 33.093 kDa. The isoelectric point is 7.283, but is reduced to 5.86 if fully phosphorylated. Several post-translational modifications have been found by mass spectroscopy: five phosphorylation sites, one methylation site, one ubiquitination site, and one acetylation site. Most of these modifications happen in the latter half of the protein.

=== Structure ===
The majority of the protein consists of the domain DUF2870. This domain is primarily found in homologues of CFAP298, but also in other uncharacterized proteins, and it contains the majority of the sites that are modified after translation. The protein is predicted to consist mostly of alpha helices and lack beta strands.

=== Localization ===
CFAP298 has been shown to localize to the cytosol and the nucleus, but has been predicted, albeit with less strength, to localize to the cytoskeleton, peroxisome, and the mitochondria.

=== Interactions ===
Through mass spectrometry, interactions with SUMO2, a post-translational modification protein resembling ubiquitin, and Ubiquitin C have been identified. Through two-hybrid experiments, an interaction with MAPK6, a protein kinase, has been found.

== Recent Studies ==
A study in zebrafish has shown CFAP298 is found in high concentrations in the Kupffer vesicles, and is intracellularly localized to the basal body of the cilia. Zebrafish mutant in CFAP298 homologue have defects in ciliary motility. Additionally, motile cilia in zebrafish and xenopus CFAP298 mutants are immotile and mispolarized, suggesting CFAP298 plays roles in planar cell polarity as well as ciliary motility.
