= FLRT1 =

Protein-coding gene in the species Homo sapiens

Identifiers
- Aliases: FLRT1, SPG68, fibronectin leucine rich transmembrane protein 1
- External IDs: OMIM: 604806; MGI: 3026647; GeneCards: FLRT1

Gene location (Human)
Chr.	Chromosome 11 (human)
Band	11q13.1	Start	64,035,931 bp
Band	11q13.1	End	64,119,173 bp

Gene location (Mouse)
Chr.	Chromosome 19 (mouse)
Band	19|19 A	Start	7,069,366 bp
Band	19|19 A	End	7,083,094 bp
RNA expression pattern
Bgee	Human / Mouse (ortholog); Top expressed in: Brodmann area 10; frontal pole; buccal mucosa cell; paraflocculus of cerebellum; ventral tegmental area; inferior ganglion of vagus nerve; cerebellar vermis; thalamus; globus pallidus; internal globus pallidus / Top expressed in: olfactory epithelium; olfactory tubercle; medial dorsal nucleus; otolith organ; utricle; cingulate gyrus; primary motor cortex; human kidney; lumbar subsegment of spinal cord; globus pallidus; More reference expression data
BioGPS	n/a
Gene ontology
Molecular function	protein-macromolecule adaptor activity; fibroblast growth factor receptor binding; protein kinase inhibitor activity
Cellular component	cytoplasm; integral component of membrane; cell projection; endoplasmic reticulum membrane; membrane; cell-cell junction; focal adhesion; integral component of plasma membrane; neuronal cell body membrane; extracellular region; cell junction; endoplasmic reticulum; perinuclear region of cytoplasm; neuron projection terminus; cytoplasmic vesicle membrane; cytoplasmic vesicle; plasma membrane; extracellular space; extracellular matrix
Biological process	negative regulation of protein kinase activity; cytokine-mediated signaling pathway; dendrite development; neuron projection extension; multicellular organism development; cell adhesion; negative regulation of receptor signaling pathway via JAK-STAT; positive regulation of synapse assembly; fibroblast growth factor receptor signaling pathway
Sources:Amigo / QuickGO
Orthologs
Databases	NCBI: entry; OMA: entry
Species	Human	Mouse
Entrez	23769	396184
Ensembl	ENSG00000126500	ENSMUSG00000047787
UniProt	Q9NZU1	Q6RKD8
RefSeq (mRNA)	NM_013280; NM_001384466	NM_201411
RefSeq (protein)	NP_037412	NP_958813
Location (UCSC)	Chr 11: 64.04 – 64.12 Mb	Chr 19: 7.07 – 7.08 Mb
PubMed search
- Wikidata
View/Edit Human	View/Edit Mouse

Fibronectin leucine rich transmembrane protein 1 is a protein that in humans is encoded by the FLRT1 gene.

== Function ==
This gene encodes a member of the fibronectin leucine rich transmembrane protein (FLRT) family. The family members may function in cell adhesion and/or receptor signalling. Their protein structures resemble small leucine-rich proteoglycans found in the extracellular matrix. The encoded protein shares sequence similarity with two other family members, FLRT2 and FLRT3. This gene is expressed in the kidney and brain.
