= Acetyl activating enzyme =

Acetyl activating enzyme may refer to:

- Acetyl-CoA synthetase, an enzyme
- Long-chain-fatty-acid—CoA ligase, an enzyme
