= FLRT3 =

Protein-coding gene in the species Homo sapiens

Identifiers
- Aliases: FLRT3, HH21, fibronectin leucine rich transmembrane protein 3
- External IDs: OMIM: 604808; MGI: 1918686; GeneCards: FLRT3
Available structures
PDB	Ortholog search: PDBe RCSB
PDB	List of PDB id codes 5CMN, 5CMP

Gene location (Human)
Chr.	Chromosome 20 (human)
Band	20p12.1	Start	14,322,985 bp
Band	20p12.1	End	14,337,614 bp

Gene location (Mouse)
Chr.	Chromosome 2 (mouse)
Band	2|2 F3	Start	140,492,834 bp
Band	2|2 F3	End	140,513,389 bp
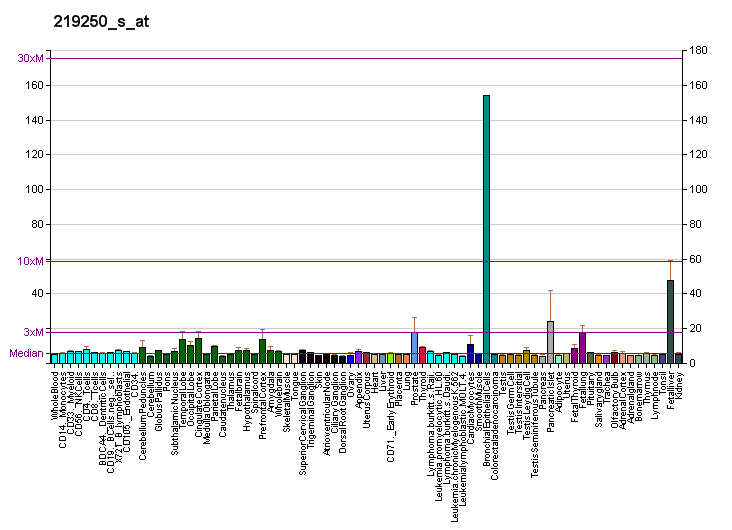
RNA expression pattern
Bgee	Human / Mouse (ortholog); Top expressed in: endothelial cell; lower lobe of lung; pericardium; Brodmann area 23; middle temporal gyrus; renal medulla; visceral pleura; germinal epithelium; jejunal mucosa; hair follicle / Top expressed in: genital tubercle; hand; abdominal wall; tail of embryo; hair follicle; mandibular prominence; otolith organ; ganglionic eminence; maxillary prominence; olfactory tubercle; More reference expression data
BioGPS	More reference expression data
Gene ontology
Molecular function	protein-macromolecule adaptor activity; protein homodimerization activity; fibroblast growth factor receptor binding; protein kinase inhibitor activity; protein binding; chemorepellent activity
Cellular component	cytoplasm; axon terminus; integral component of membrane; synaptic membrane; cell projection; endoplasmic reticulum membrane; membrane; cell-cell junction; focal adhesion; axonal growth cone; integral component of plasma membrane; extracellular region; axon; endoplasmic reticulum; extracellular space; cytosol; plasma membrane; cell junction; extracellular matrix; glutamatergic synapse; integral component of postsynaptic membrane
Biological process	negative chemotaxis; negative regulation of protein kinase activity; cytokine-mediated signaling pathway; head development; neuron projection extension; axon guidance; multicellular organism development; development of the heart; cell adhesion; response to axon injury; embryonic morphogenesis; proepicardium cell migration involved in pericardium morphogenesis; synapse assembly; neuron projection development; negative regulation of receptor signaling pathway via JAK-STAT; positive regulation of synapse assembly; fibroblast growth factor receptor signaling pathway; cell-cell adhesion via plasma-membrane adhesion molecules; synaptic membrane adhesion
Sources:Amigo / QuickGO
Orthologs
Databases	NCBI: entry; OMA: entry
Species	Human	Mouse
Entrez	23767	71436
Ensembl	ENSG00000125848	ENSMUSG00000051379
UniProt	Q9NZU0	Q8BGT1
RefSeq (mRNA)	NM_013281; NM_198391	NM_001172160; NM_178382
RefSeq (protein)	NP_037413; NP_938205	NP_001165631; NP_848469
Location (UCSC)	Chr 20: 14.32 – 14.34 Mb	Chr 2: 140.49 – 140.51 Mb
PubMed search
- Wikidata
View/Edit Human	View/Edit Mouse

Leucine-rich repeat transmembrane protein FLRT3 is a protein that in humans is encoded by the FLRT3 gene.

FLRT1, FLRT2 and FLRT3 are members of the fibronectin leucine rich transmembrane protein (FLRT) family. They may function in cell adhesion and/or receptor signalling. Their protein structures resemble small leucine-rich proteoglycans found in the extracellular matrix. FLRT3 shares 55% amino acid sequence identity with FLRT1 and 44% identity with FLRT2. FLRT3 is expressed in kidney, brain, pancreas, skeletal muscle, lung, liver, placenta, and heart. Two alternatively spliced transcript variants encoding the same protein have been described for this gene.
