= TCP10L =

Protein-coding gene in the species Homo sapiens

Identifiers
- Aliases: TCP10L, C21orf77, TCP10A-2, PRED77, t-complex 10-like, t-complex 10 like, TCP10A-1, LINC00846
- External IDs: OMIM: 608365; HomoloGene: 77329; GeneCards: TCP10L; OMA:TCP10L - orthologs

Gene location (Human)
Chr.	Chromosome 21 (human)
Band	21q22.11	Start	32,497,967 bp
Band	21q22.11	End	32,587,373 bp
RNA expression pattern
Bgee	Human / Mouse (ortholog); Top expressed in: left testis; right testis; testicle; right lobe of liver; cerebellar hemisphere; right hemisphere of cerebellum; right uterine tube; gonad; corpus callosum; Brodmann area 9 / n/a; More reference expression data
BioGPS	n/a
Gene ontology
Molecular function	protein self-association; transcription corepressor activity; protein binding; identical protein binding
Cellular component	nucleus; centriole
Biological process	regulation of transcription, DNA-templated; negative regulation of transcription by RNA polymerase II; transcription, DNA-templated
Sources:Amigo / QuickGO
Orthologs
Species	Human	Mouse
Entrez	140290	n/a
Ensembl	ENSG00000242220	n/a
UniProt	Q9NV44; Q8TDR4	n/a
RefSeq (mRNA)	NM_144659; NM_018277	n/a
RefSeq (protein)	NP_653260.1; NP_653260	n/a
Location (UCSC)	Chr 21: 32.5 – 32.59 Mb	n/a
PubMed search		n/a
- Wikidata
View/Edit Human

T-complex protein 10A homolog 2 is a protein that in humans is encoded by the TCP10L gene. It is located next to CFAP298.
