= Triacsin C =

Small-molecule enzyme inhibitor

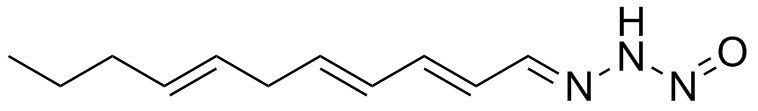

Names
- IUPAC name N-(((2E,4E,7E)-undeca-2,4,7-trienylidene)amino)nitrous amide

Identifiers
CAS Number	76896-80-5
3D model (JSmol)	Interactive image
ChEBI	CHEBI:144441
ChemSpider	7851228
ECHA InfoCard	100.127.901
PubChem CID	9576787
UNII	6M6D4602I5
CompTox Dashboard (EPA)	DTXSID70894877
- InChI: InChI=1S/C11H17N3O/c1-2-3-4-5-6-7-8-9-10-11-12-13-14-15/h4-5,7-11H,2-3,6H2,1H3,(H,13,15)/b5-4+,8-7+,10-9+,12-11+ Key: NKTGCVUIESDXPU-YLEPRARLSA-N; InChI=1/C11H17N3O/c1-2-3-4-5-6-7-8-9-10-11-12-13-14-15/h4-5,7-11H,2-3,6H2,1H3,(H,13,15)/b5-4+,8-7+,10-9+,12-11+ Key: NKTGCVUIESDXPU-YLEPRARLBF
- SMILES: O=NN/N=C/C=C/C=C/C/C=C/CCC

Properties
Chemical formula	C_{11}H_{17}N_{3}O
Molar mass	207.277 g·mol^{−1}
- Except where otherwise noted, data are given for materials in their standard state (at 25 °C [77 °F], 100 kPa). verify (what is ?) Infobox references

Triacsin C is an inhibitor of long fatty acyl CoA synthetase that has been isolated from Streptomyces aureofaciens. It blocks β-cell apoptosis, induced by fatty acids (lipoapoptosis) in a rat model of obesity. In addition, it blocks the de novo synthesis of triglycerides, diglycerides, and cholesterol esters, thus interfering with lipid metabolism.

In addition, triacsin C is a vasodilator.

Inhibition of lipid metabolism reduces/removes lipid droplets from HuH7 cells. In hepatitis C–infected HuH7 cells, this reduction/removal of lipid droplets by triacsin C correlates with a reduction in virion assembly and infectivity.

== General chemical description ==
Triacsin C belongs to a family of bacterial secondary metabolites all having an 11-carbon chain with a common N-hydroxytriazene moiety at the terminus. Due to the N-hydroxytriazene group, triacsin C has acidic properties and may be considered a polyunsaturated fatty acid analog.

Triacsin C was discovered by a group led by Keizo Yoshida in 1982 from a culture of the actinobacteria now known as Kitasatospora aureofaciens.

== See also ==
- Fatty acid degradation#Activation_and_transport_into_mitochondria
- Fatty acyl CoA synthetase
