= SLC27A2 =

Protein-coding gene in the species Homo sapiens

Identifiers
- Aliases: SLC27A2, ACSVL1, FACVL1, FATP2, HsT17226, VLACS, VLCS, hFACVL1, solute carrier family 27 member 2
- External IDs: OMIM: 603247; MGI: 1347099; GeneCards: SLC27A2
Enzyme activity
EC #	BRENDA	ExPASy	KEGG	MetaCyc
6.2.1.3	↗	↗	↗	↗
6.2.1.7	↗	↗	↗	↗
6.2.1.15	↗	↗	↗	↗
6.2.1.24	↗	↗	↗	↗

Gene location (Human)
Chr.	Chromosome 15 (human)
Band	15q21.2	Start	50,182,196 bp
Band	15q21.2	End	50,236,385 bp

Gene location (Mouse)
Chr.	Chromosome 2 (mouse)
Band	2|2 F1	Start	126,394,327 bp
Band	2|2 F1	End	126,430,163 bp
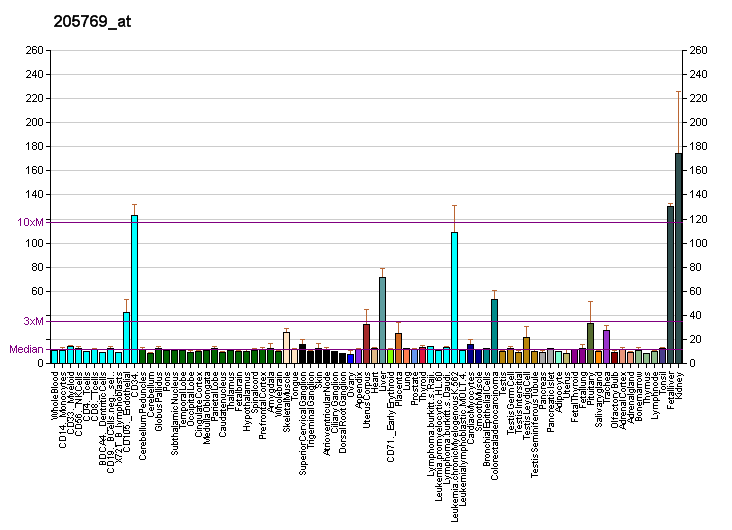

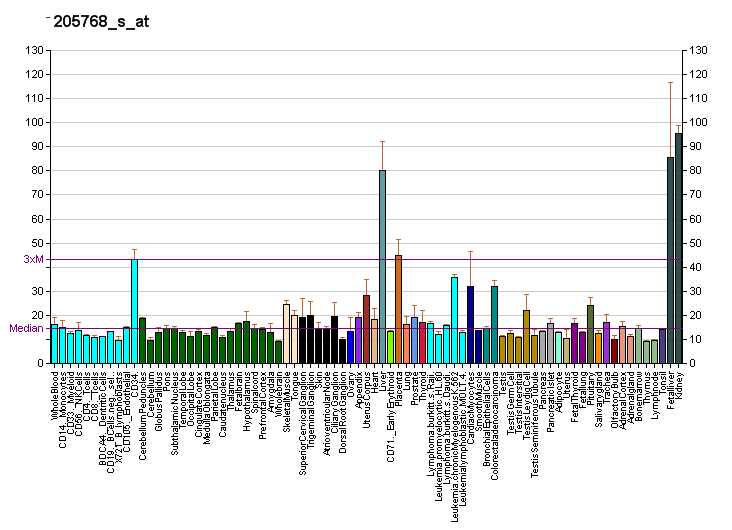
RNA expression pattern
Bgee	Human / Mouse (ortholog); Top expressed in: bronchial epithelial cell; liver; right lobe of liver; kidney tubule; corpus epididymis; mucosa of transverse colon; caput epididymis; mucosa of paranasal sinus; glomerulus; metanephric glomerulus / Top expressed in: right kidney; proximal tubule; human kidney; left lobe of liver; saccule; olfactory epithelium; parotid gland; Paneth cell; gallbladder; lacrimal gland; More reference expression data
BioGPS	More reference expression data
Gene ontology
Molecular function	nucleotide binding; fatty acid transmembrane transporter activity; ligase activity; catalytic activity; enzyme binding; signaling receptor binding; very long-chain fatty acid-CoA ligase activity; ATP binding; phytanate-CoA ligase activity; pristanate-CoA ligase activity; decanoate-CoA ligase activity; long-chain fatty acid-CoA ligase activity; long-chain fatty acid transporter activity
Cellular component	integral component of membrane; endoplasmic reticulum lumen; endoplasmic reticulum membrane; membrane; peroxisomal membrane; peroxisome; integral component of endoplasmic reticulum membrane; endoplasmic reticulum; mitochondrion; integral component of peroxisomal membrane; extracellular exosome; plasma membrane; specific granule membrane; cytosol
Biological process	lipid metabolism; very long-chain fatty acid metabolic process; fatty acid transport; fatty acid metabolic process; long-chain fatty acid import into cell; fatty acid alpha-oxidation; very long-chain fatty acid catabolic process; fatty acid beta-oxidation; metabolism; long-chain fatty acid metabolic process; bile acid biosynthetic process; methyl-branched fatty acid metabolic process; neutrophil degranulation; protein targeting to peroxisome
Sources:Amigo / QuickGO
Orthologs
Databases	NCBI: entry; OMA: entry
Species	Human	Mouse
Entrez	11001	26458
Ensembl	ENSG00000140284	ENSMUSG00000027359
UniProt	O14975	O35488
RefSeq (mRNA)	NM_003645; NM_001159629	NM_011978
RefSeq (protein)	NP_001153101; NP_003636	NP_036108
Location (UCSC)	Chr 15: 50.18 – 50.24 Mb	Chr 2: 126.39 – 126.43 Mb
PubMed search
- Wikidata
View/Edit Human	View/Edit Mouse

Long-chain fatty acid transport protein 2 is an enzyme that in humans is encoded by the SLC27A2 gene.

The protein encoded by this gene is an isozyme of long-chain fatty-acid-coenzyme A ligase family. Although differing in substrate specificity, subcellular localization, and tissue distribution, all isozymes of this family convert free long-chain fatty acids into fatty acyl-CoA esters, and thereby play a key role in lipid biosynthesis and fatty acid degradation. This isozyme activates long-chain, branched-chain and very long chain fatty acids containing 22 or more carbons to their CoA derivatives. It is expressed primarily in liver and kidney and is present in both endoplasmic reticulum and peroxisomes but not in mitochondria. Its decreased peroxisomal enzyme activity is in part responsible for the biochemical pathology in X-linked adrenoleukodystrophy.

== See also ==
- Solute carrier family
