= EVA1A =

Protein-coding gene in the species Homo sapiens

Identifiers
- Aliases: EVA1A, FAM176A, TMEM166, eva-1 homolog A, regulator of programmed cell death
- External IDs: MGI: 2385247; HomoloGene: 12969; GeneCards: EVA1A; OMA:EVA1A - orthologs

Gene location (Human)
Chr.	Chromosome 2 (human)
Band	2p12	Start	75,469,302 bp
Band	2p12	End	75,569,722 bp

Gene location (Mouse)
Chr.	Chromosome 6 (mouse)
Band	6|6 C3	Start	82,018,024 bp
Band	6|6 C3	End	82,070,080 bp
RNA expression pattern
Bgee	Human / Mouse (ortholog); Top expressed in: right lobe of liver; cartilage tissue; body of pancreas; upper lobe of left lung; human kidney; placenta; spleen; right lung; stromal cell of endometrium; islet of Langerhans / Top expressed in: left lobe of liver; right kidney; human kidney; lumbar subsegment of spinal cord; proximal tubule; morula; blastocyst; cornea; molar; left lung lobe; More reference expression data
BioGPS	n/a
Orthologs
Species	Human	Mouse
Entrez	84141	232146
Ensembl	ENSG00000115363	ENSMUSG00000035104
UniProt	Q9H8M9	Q91WM6
RefSeq (mRNA)	NM_032181; NM_001135032; NM_001369524; NM_001369525	NM_145570
RefSeq (protein)	NP_001128504; NP_115557; NP_001356453; NP_001356454	NP_663545
Location (UCSC)	Chr 2: 75.47 – 75.57 Mb	Chr 6: 82.02 – 82.07 Mb
PubMed search
- Wikidata
View/Edit Human	View/Edit Mouse

Eva-1 homolog A (C. elegans) is a protein that in humans is encoded by the EVA1A gene.
