= CD320 =

Human gene

Identifiers
- Aliases: CD320, 8D6, 8D6A, TCBLR, CD320 molecule, TCN2R
- External IDs: OMIM: 606475; MGI: 1860083; GeneCards: CD320
Available structures
PDB	Ortholog search: PDBe RCSB
PDB	List of PDB id codes 4ZRP

Gene location (Human)
Chr.	Chromosome 19 (human)
Band	19p13.2	Start	8,302,127 bp
Band	19p13.2	End	8,308,358 bp

Gene location (Mouse)
Chr.	Chromosome 17 (mouse)
Band	17 B1|17 17.98 cM	Start	34,062,065 bp
Band	17 B1|17 17.98 cM	End	34,068,748 bp
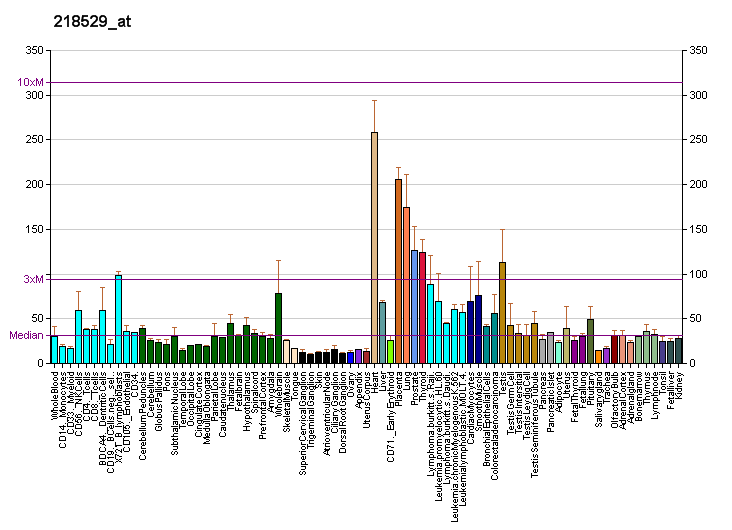
RNA expression pattern
Bgee	Human / Mouse (ortholog); Top expressed in: mucosa of transverse colon; apex of heart; left testis; right testis; spleen; body of stomach; right adrenal cortex; right lobe of thyroid gland; left adrenal gland; left coronary artery / Top expressed in: spermatocyte; spermatid; seminiferous tubule; right kidney; morula; morula; embryo; parotid gland; epithelium of stomach; embryo; More reference expression data
BioGPS	More reference expression data
Gene ontology
Molecular function	cobalamin binding; growth factor activity; ABC-type vitamin B12 transporter activity; protein binding; calcium ion binding; metal ion binding
Cellular component	integral component of membrane; endosome membrane; endoplasmic reticulum; membrane; extracellular exosome; integral component of plasma membrane; plasma membrane
Biological process	cobalamin metabolic process; regulation of vitamin metabolic process; cobalamin transport; positive regulation of B cell proliferation; B cell costimulation; regulation of signaling receptor activity; signal transduction
Sources:Amigo / QuickGO
Orthologs
Databases	NCBI: entry; OMA: entry
Species	Human	Mouse
Entrez	51293	54219
Ensembl	ENSG00000167775	ENSMUSG00000002308
UniProt	Q9NPF0	Q9Z1P5
RefSeq (mRNA)	NM_016579; NM_001165895	NM_019421; NM_001305169
RefSeq (protein)	NP_001159367; NP_057663	NP_001292098; NP_062294
Location (UCSC)	Chr 19: 8.3 – 8.31 Mb	Chr 17: 34.06 – 34.07 Mb
PubMed search
- Wikidata
View/Edit Human	View/Edit Mouse

CD320 (cluster of differentiation 320) is a human gene.
