= USE1 =

Protein-coding gene in the species Homo sapiens

Identifiers
- Aliases: USE1, P31, SLT1, D12, MDS032, unconventional SNARE in the ER 1
- External IDs: OMIM: 610675; MGI: 1914273; HomoloGene: 10214; GeneCards: USE1; OMA:USE1 - orthologs

Gene location (Human)
Chr.	Chromosome 19 (human)
Band	19p13.11	Start	17,215,346 bp
Band	19p13.11	End	17,219,829 bp

Gene location (Mouse)
Chr.	Chromosome 8 (mouse)
Band	8|8 B3.3	Start	71,819,492 bp
Band	8|8 B3.3	End	71,822,376 bp
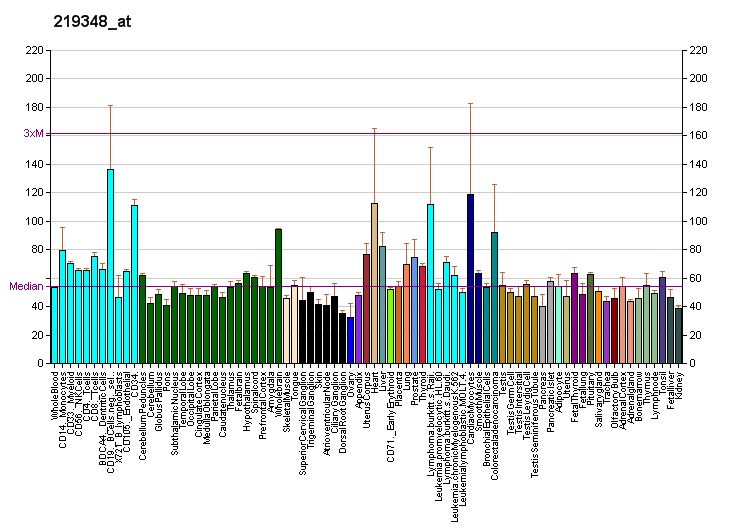

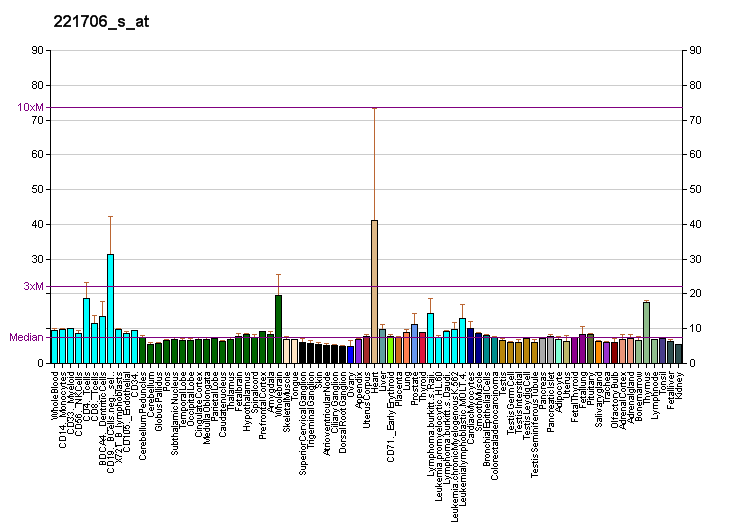
RNA expression pattern
Bgee	Human / Mouse (ortholog); Top expressed in: tendon of biceps brachii; anterior cingulate cortex; apex of heart; prefrontal cortex; amygdala; right frontal lobe; C1 segment; putamen; nucleus accumbens; Brodmann area 9 / Top expressed in: superior surface of tongue; transitional epithelium of urinary bladder; supraoptic nucleus; vestibular sensory epithelium; interventricular septum; gallbladder; right lung lobe; skin of external ear; seminal vesicula; corneal stroma; More reference expression data
BioGPS	More reference expression data
Gene ontology
Molecular function	protein binding
Cellular component	integral component of membrane; lysosome; endoplasmic reticulum; membrane; endoplasmic reticulum membrane
Biological process	lysosomal transport; protein transport; endoplasmic reticulum to Golgi vesicle-mediated transport; protein catabolic process; vesicle-mediated transport; secretion by cell; retrograde vesicle-mediated transport, Golgi to endoplasmic reticulum
Sources:Amigo / QuickGO
Orthologs
Species	Human	Mouse
Entrez	55850	67023
Ensembl	ENSG00000053501	ENSMUSG00000002395
UniProt	Q9NZ43	Q9CQ56
RefSeq (mRNA)	NM_018467	NM_001145780; NM_025917; NM_029768
RefSeq (protein)	NP_060937	NP_001139252; NP_080193
Location (UCSC)	Chr 19: 17.22 – 17.22 Mb	Chr 8: 71.82 – 71.82 Mb
PubMed search
- Wikidata
View/Edit Human	View/Edit Mouse

Uncharacterized hematopoietic stem/progenitor cells protein MDS032, also known as MDS032, is a protein which in humans is encoded by the MDS032 gene.

== Function ==
D12, the mouse homolog of MDS032, is a SNARE protein involved with the Golgi secretory apparatus and with endosome-lysosome transport.
