= ACSL6 =

Protein-coding gene in the species Homo sapiens

Identifiers
- Aliases: ACSL6, ACS2, FACL6, LACS 6, LACS2, LACS5, acyl-CoA synthetase long-chain family member 6, acyl-CoA synthetase long chain family member 6
- External IDs: OMIM: 604443; MGI: 894291; GeneCards: ACSL6
Enzyme activity
EC #	BRENDA	ExPASy	KEGG	MetaCyc
6.2.1.3	↗	↗	↗	↗
6.2.1.15	↗	↗	↗	↗

Gene location (Human)
Chr.	Chromosome 5 (human)
Band	5q31.1	Start	131,949,973 bp
Band	5q31.1	End	132,012,243 bp

Gene location (Mouse)
Chr.	Chromosome 11 (mouse)
Band	11 B1.3|11 32.13 cM	Start	54,303,798 bp
Band	11 B1.3|11 32.13 cM	End	54,364,756 bp
RNA expression pattern
Bgee	Human / Mouse (ortholog); Top expressed in: lateral nuclear group of thalamus; Brodmann area 23; primary visual cortex; right hemisphere of cerebellum; pons; seminal vesicula; Brodmann area 9; endothelial cell; right frontal lobe; left testis / Top expressed in: olfactory epithelium; retinal pigment epithelium; deep cerebellar nuclei; central gray substance of midbrain; medial vestibular nucleus; dorsal tegmental nucleus; anterior horn of spinal cord; inferior colliculi; pontine nuclei; neural layer of retina; More reference expression data
BioGPS	n/a
Gene ontology
Molecular function	nucleotide binding; protein homodimerization activity; ligase activity; catalytic activity; enzyme binding; ATP binding; decanoate-CoA ligase activity; long-chain fatty acid-CoA ligase activity
Cellular component	organelle membrane; integral component of membrane; endoplasmic reticulum membrane; membrane; intracellular membrane-bounded organelle; plasma membrane; peroxisomal membrane; peroxisome; mitochondrial outer membrane; endoplasmic reticulum; mitochondrion
Biological process	acyl-CoA metabolic process; lipid metabolism; fatty acid metabolic process; long-chain fatty-acyl-CoA biosynthetic process; metabolism; long-chain fatty acid metabolic process; neuroblast proliferation
Sources:Amigo / QuickGO
Orthologs
Databases	NCBI: entry; OMA: entry
Species	Human	Mouse
Entrez	23305	216739
Ensembl	ENSG00000164398	ENSMUSG00000020333
UniProt	Q9UKU0	Q91WC3
RefSeq (mRNA)	NM_015256; NM_001009185; NM_001205247; NM_001205248; NM_001205250 NM_001205251	NM_001033597; NM_001033598; NM_001033599; NM_144823
RefSeq (protein)	NP_001009185; NP_001192176; NP_001192177; NP_001192179; NP_001192180 NP_056071	NP_001028769; NP_001028770; NP_001028771; NP_659072
Location (UCSC)	Chr 5: 131.95 – 132.01 Mb	Chr 11: 54.3 – 54.36 Mb
PubMed search
- Wikidata
View/Edit Human	View/Edit Mouse

Acyl-CoA synthetase long-chain family member 6 is an enzyme that in humans is encoded by the ACSL6 gene. Long-chain acyl-CoA synthetases such as ACSL6, catalyze the formation of acyl-CoA from fatty acids, ATP, and CoA.

== Structure ==
The ACSL6 gene is located on the 5th chromosome, with its specific location being 5q31.1. The gene contains 23 exons. ACSL6 encodes a 77.7 kDa protein that is composed of 697 amino acids; 10 peptides have been observed through mass spectrometry data.
