= ACSL5 =

Protein-coding gene in the species Homo sapiens

Identifiers
- Aliases: ACSL5, ACS2, ACS5, FACL5, acyl-CoA synthetase long-chain family member 5, acyl-CoA synthetase long chain family member 5
- External IDs: OMIM: 605677; MGI: 1919129; HomoloGene: 69208; GeneCards: ACSL5; OMA:ACSL5 - orthologs

Gene location (Human)
Chr.	Chromosome 10 (human)
Band	10q25.2	Start	112,374,116 bp
Band	10q25.2	End	112,428,379 bp

Gene location (Mouse)
Chr.	Chromosome 19 (mouse)
Band	19|19 D2	Start	55,240,370 bp
Band	19|19 D2	End	55,286,152 bp
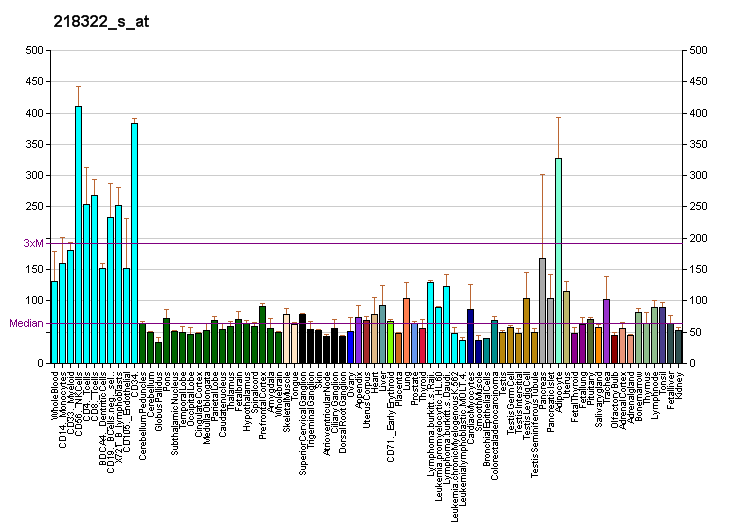
RNA expression pattern
Bgee	Human / Mouse (ortholog); Top expressed in: jejunal mucosa; mucosa of ileum; corpus epididymis; rectum; mucosa of transverse colon; mucosa of sigmoid colon; duodenum; right lobe of liver; endometrium; right uterine tube / Top expressed in: jejunum; duodenum; ileum; skin of external ear; migratory enteric neural crest cell; transitional epithelium of urinary bladder; epithelium of stomach; left lobe of liver; right lung; right lung lobe; More reference expression data
BioGPS	More reference expression data
Gene ontology
Molecular function	nucleotide binding; ligase activity; catalytic activity; ATP binding; long-chain fatty acid-CoA ligase activity; decanoate-CoA ligase activity
Cellular component	integral component of membrane; mitochondrial outer membrane; nucleolus; mitochondrial inner membrane; nucleus; membrane; endoplasmic reticulum membrane; endoplasmic reticulum; mitochondrion
Biological process	regulation of extrinsic apoptotic signaling pathway; lipid metabolism; fatty acid metabolic process; long-chain fatty-acyl-CoA biosynthetic process; metabolism; long-chain fatty acid metabolic process
Sources:Amigo / QuickGO
Orthologs
Species	Human	Mouse
Entrez	51703	433256
Ensembl	ENSG00000197142	ENSMUSG00000024981
UniProt	Q9ULC5	Q8JZR0
RefSeq (mRNA)	NM_203380; NM_016234; NM_203379; NM_001387037	NM_027976
RefSeq (protein)	NP_057318; NP_976313; NP_976314	NP_082252
Location (UCSC)	Chr 10: 112.37 – 112.43 Mb	Chr 19: 55.24 – 55.29 Mb
PubMed search
- Wikidata
View/Edit Human	View/Edit Mouse

Long-chain-fatty-acid—CoA ligase 5 is an enzyme that in humans is encoded by the ACSL5 gene.

The protein encoded by this gene is an isozyme of the long-chain-fatty-acid-CoA ligase family. Although differing in substrate specificity, subcellular localization, and tissue distribution, all isozymes of this family convert free long-chain fatty acids into fatty acyl-CoA esters, and thereby play a key role in lipid biosynthesis and fatty acid degradation. This isozyme is highly expressed in uterus and spleen, and in trace amounts in normal brain, but has markedly increased levels in malignant gliomas. This gene functions in mediating fatty acid-induced glioma cell growth. Three transcript variants encoding two different isoforms have been found for this gene.
