= FLRT2 =

Protein-coding gene in the species Homo sapiens

Identifiers
- Aliases: FLRT2, fibronectin leucine rich transmembrane protein 2
- External IDs: OMIM: 604807; MGI: 3603594; GeneCards: FLRT2
Available structures
PDB	Ortholog search: PDBe RCSB
PDB	List of PDB id codes 4V2C, 4V2D

Gene location (Human)
Chr.	Chromosome 14 (human)
Band	14q31.3	Start	85,530,144 bp
Band	14q31.3	End	85,654,428 bp

Gene location (Mouse)
Chr.	Chromosome 12 (mouse)
Band	12|12 E	Start	95,659,000 bp
Band	12|12 E	End	95,751,989 bp
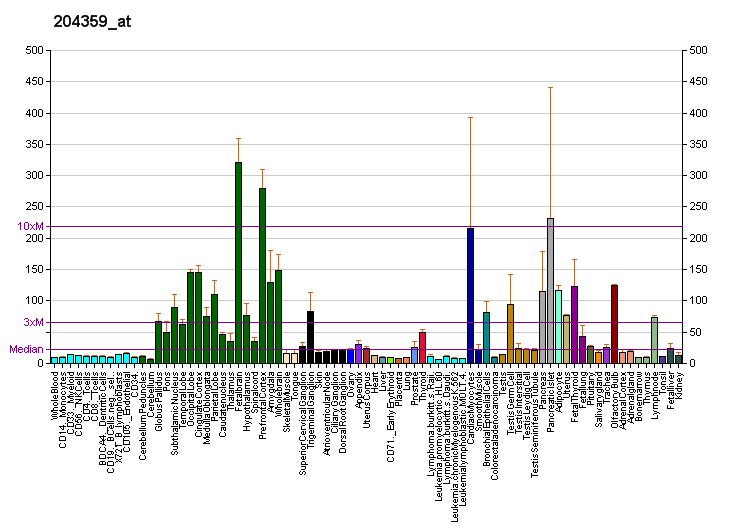

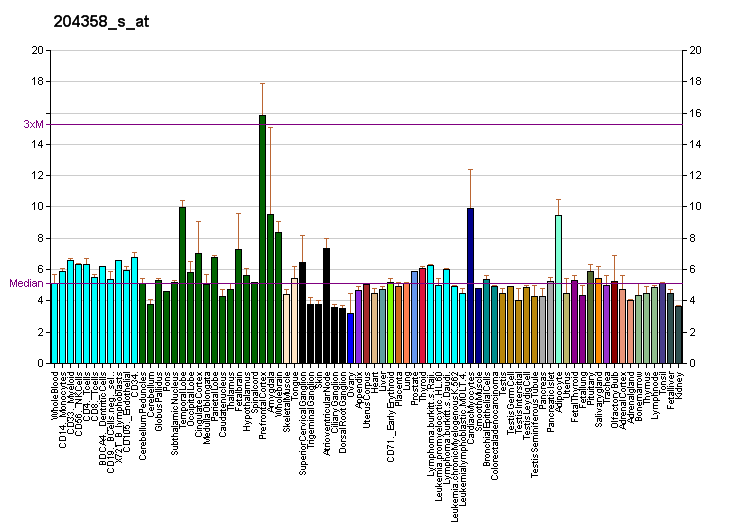
RNA expression pattern
Bgee	Human / Mouse (ortholog); Top expressed in: germinal epithelium; parietal pleura; middle temporal gyrus; retinal pigment epithelium; spinal ganglia; Brodmann area 23; trigeminal ganglion; body of pancreas; tibia; Epithelium of choroid plexus / Top expressed in: Rostral migratory stream; ciliary body; retinal pigment epithelium; vestibular membrane of cochlear duct; epithelium of lens; endothelial cell of lymphatic vessel; sciatic nerve; vas deferens; hand; conjunctival fornix; More reference expression data
BioGPS	More reference expression data
Gene ontology
Molecular function	protein-macromolecule adaptor activity; fibroblast growth factor receptor binding; protein kinase inhibitor activity; chemorepellent activity
Cellular component	cytoplasm; organelle membrane; integral component of membrane; endoplasmic reticulum membrane; membrane; intracellular membrane-bounded organelle; cell-cell junction; focal adhesion; synapse; integral component of plasma membrane; extracellular region; cell junction; endoplasmic reticulum; neuron projection; extracellular exosome; plasma membrane; extracellular space; extracellular matrix
Biological process	negative chemotaxis; negative regulation of protein kinase activity; cytokine-mediated signaling pathway; cell adhesion involved in heart morphogenesis; heart morphogenesis; axon guidance; multicellular organism development; cell adhesion; basement membrane organization; regulation of neuron migration; negative regulation of receptor signaling pathway via JAK-STAT; positive regulation of synapse assembly; fibroblast growth factor receptor signaling pathway; biological process
Sources:Amigo / QuickGO
Orthologs
Databases	NCBI: entry; OMA: entry
Species	Human	Mouse
Entrez	23768	399558
Ensembl	ENSG00000185070	ENSMUSG00000047414
UniProt	O43155	Q8BLU0
RefSeq (mRNA)	NM_001346143; NM_001346144; NM_001346145; NM_001346146; NM_013231	NM_201518
RefSeq (protein)	NP_001333072; NP_001333073; NP_001333074; NP_001333075; NP_037363	NP_958926
Location (UCSC)	Chr 14: 85.53 – 85.65 Mb	Chr 12: 95.66 – 95.75 Mb
PubMed search
- Wikidata
View/Edit Human	View/Edit Mouse

Fibronectin leucine-rich repeat transmembrane protein FLRT2 is a protein that in humans is encoded by the FLRT2 gene.

== Function ==
This gene encodes a member of the fibronectin leucine rich transmembrane protein (FLRT) family. FLRT family members may function in cell adhesion and/or receptor signalling. Their protein structures resemble small leucine-rich proteoglycans found in the extracellular matrix.
