= HECW2 =

Protein-coding gene in the species Homo sapiens

Identifiers
- Aliases: HECW2, NEDL2, HECT, C2 and WW domain containing E3 ubiquitin protein ligase 2, NDHSAL
- External IDs: OMIM: 617245; MGI: 2685817; GeneCards: HECW2
Available structures
PDB	Ortholog search: PDBe RCSB
PDB	List of PDB id codes 2LFE
Enzyme activity
EC #	BRENDA	ExPASy	KEGG	MetaCyc
2.3.2.26	↗	↗	↗	↗

Gene location (Human)
Chr.	Chromosome 2 (human)
Band	2q32.3	Start	196,189,099 bp
Band	2q32.3	End	196,593,684 bp

Gene location (Mouse)
Chr.	Chromosome 1 (mouse)
Band	1|1 C1.1	Start	53,846,035 bp
Band	1|1 C1.1	End	54,234,327 bp
RNA expression pattern
Bgee	Human / Mouse (ortholog); Top expressed in: myocardium of left ventricle; Brodmann area 23; middle temporal gyrus; visceral pleura; testicle; upper lobe of lung; upper lobe of left lung; right lung; primary visual cortex; Brodmann area 46 / Top expressed in: epithelium of stomach; lumbar subsegment of spinal cord; substantia nigra; medial geniculate nucleus; lateral geniculate nucleus; primary motor cortex; habenula; medial dorsal nucleus; prefrontal cortex; lobe of cerebellum; More reference expression data
BioGPS	n/a
Gene ontology
Molecular function	transferase activity; ubiquitin-protein transferase activity; protein binding; ubiquitin protein ligase activity
Cellular component	mitotic spindle; spindle; cytoskeleton; cytoplasm
Biological process	protein ubiquitination; regulation of mitotic metaphase/anaphase transition; proteasome-mediated ubiquitin-dependent protein catabolic process; protein polyubiquitination; ubiquitin-dependent protein catabolic process; positive regulation of protein catabolic process; regulation of dendrite morphogenesis; negative regulation of sodium ion transmembrane transporter activity
Sources:Amigo / QuickGO
Orthologs
Databases	NCBI: entry; OMA: entry
Species	Human	Mouse
Entrez	57520	329152
Ensembl	ENSG00000138411	ENSMUSG00000042807
UniProt	Q9P2P5	Q6I6G8
RefSeq (mRNA)	NM_001304840; NM_020760; NM_001348768	NM_001001883; NM_172655
RefSeq (protein)	NP_001291769; NP_065811; NP_001335697	NP_001001883; NP_766243
Location (UCSC)	Chr 2: 196.19 – 196.59 Mb	Chr 1: 53.85 – 54.23 Mb
PubMed search
- Wikidata
View/Edit Human	View/Edit Mouse

HECT, C2 and WW domain containing E3 ubiquitin protein ligase 2 is a protein that in humans is encoded by the HECW2 gene.

== Clinical significance ==
Mutations in the HECW2 gene have been associated to epilepsy and intellectual disability. These mutations affect one copy of the HECW2 gene and are believed to change the function of the HECW2 protein.
