= Dermatan-sulfate epimerase =

Protein-coding gene in the species Homo sapiens

DSE

Identifiers
- Aliases: DSE, DSEP, DSEPI, EDSMC2, SART-2, SART2, DS-epi1, dermatan sulfate epimerase
- External IDs: OMIM: 605942; MGI: 2443455; GeneCards: DSE
Enzyme activity
EC #	BRENDA	ExPASy	KEGG	MetaCyc
5.1.3.19	↗	↗	↗	↗

Gene location (Human)
Chr.	Chromosome 6 (human)
Band	6q22.1	Start	116,254,173 bp
Band	6q22.1	End	116,444,861 bp

Gene location (Mouse)
Chr.	Chromosome 10 (mouse)
Band	10|10 B1	Start	34,027,389 bp
Band	10|10 B1	End	34,083,711 bp
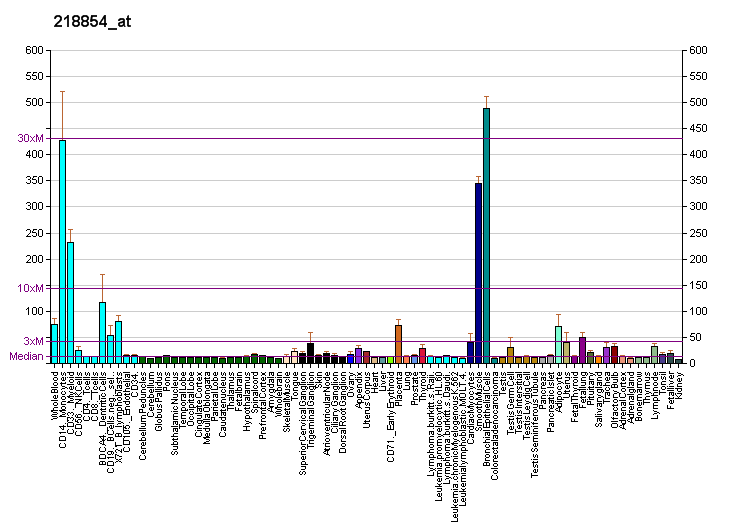
RNA expression pattern
Bgee	Human / Mouse (ortholog); Top expressed in: parietal pleura; Achilles tendon; germinal epithelium; cartilage tissue; pericardium; synovial joint; visceral pleura; synovial membrane; Epithelium of choroid plexus; right lung / Top expressed in: hand; stroma of bone marrow; decidua; dermis; intercostal muscle; Gonadal ridge; lumbar spinal ganglion; abdominal wall; calvaria; mesenteric lymph nodes; More reference expression data
BioGPS	More reference expression data
Gene ontology
Molecular function	isomerase activity; chondroitin-glucuronate 5-epimerase activity
Cellular component	integral component of membrane; Golgi membrane; Golgi apparatus; endoplasmic reticulum; membrane; nucleoplasm; cytosol
Biological process	chondroitin sulfate biosynthetic process; heparan sulfate proteoglycan biosynthetic process; dermatan sulfate biosynthetic process
Sources:Amigo / QuickGO
Orthologs
Databases	NCBI: entry; OMA: entry
Species	Human	Mouse
Entrez	29940	212898
Ensembl	ENSG00000111817	ENSMUSG00000039497
UniProt	Q9UL01	Q8BLI4
RefSeq (mRNA)	NM_001080976; NM_001322937; NM_001322938; NM_001322939; NM_001322940 NM_001322941; NM_001322943; NM_001322944; NM_013352; NM_001374520; NM_001374521; NM_001374522	NM_172508
RefSeq (protein)	NP_001074445; NP_001309866; NP_001309867; NP_001309868; NP_001309869 NP_001309870; NP_001309872; NP_001309873; NP_037484; NP_001361449; NP_001361450; NP_001361451	NP_766096
Location (UCSC)	Chr 6: 116.25 – 116.44 Mb	Chr 10: 34.03 – 34.08 Mb
PubMed search
- Wikidata
View/Edit Human	View/Edit Mouse

Dermatan-sulfate epimerase is an enzyme that in humans is encoded by the DSE gene.

The protein encoded by this gene is an epimerase required for biosynthesis of dermatan sulfate and a tumor-rejection antigen. This antigen possesses tumor epitopes capable of inducing HLA-A24-restricted and tumor-specific cytotoxic T lymphocytes in cancer patients and may be useful for specific immunotherapy. This gene product is localized to the endoplasmic reticulum. Two transcript variants encoding the same protein have been found for this gene.

== Clinical significance ==
- Ehlers–Danlos syndrome Musculocontractural type is associated with mutations in the DSE gene.
