= Long-chain-fatty-acid—CoA ligase =

Class of enzymes

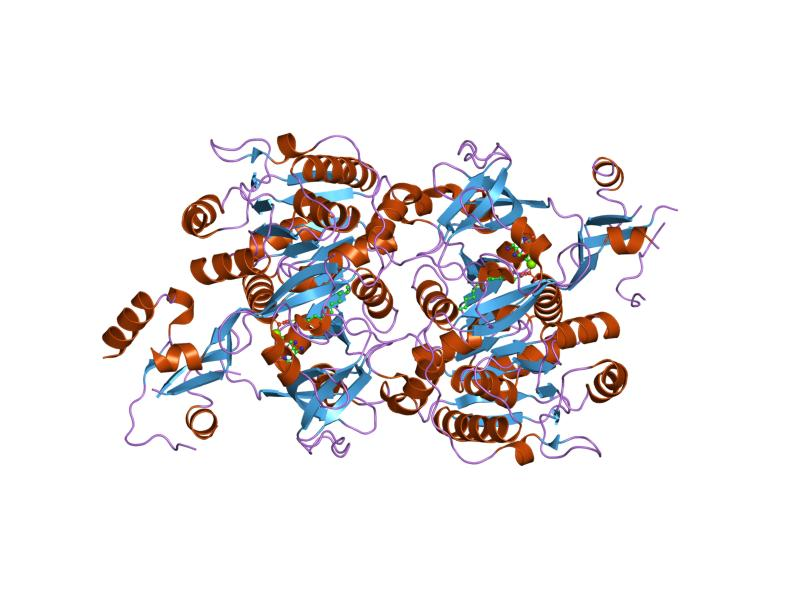
- Long chain fatty acyl-CoA synthetase homodimer from Thermus thermophilus.

Identifiers
- EC no.: 6.2.1.3
- CAS no.: 9013-18-7

Databases
- BRENDA: enzyme data
- ExPASy: NiceZyme view
- KEGG: enzyme entry
- MetaCyc: metabolic pathway
- Rhea: reactions
- PDB structures: RCSB PDB PDBe PDBsum
- Gene Ontology: AmiGO / QuickGO
Search
- PMC: articles
- PubMed: articles
- NCBI: proteins

acyl-CoA synthetase long-chain family member 1

Identifiers
- Symbol: ACSL1
- Alt. symbols: FACL2
- NCBI gene: 2180
- HGNC: 3569
- OMIM: 152425
- RefSeq: NM_001995
- UniProt: P33121

Other data
- EC number: 6.2.1.3
- Locus: Chr. 4 q35
Search for
- Structures: Swiss-model
- Domains: InterPro

The long chain fatty acyl-CoA ligase (or synthetase) is an enzyme (EC 6.2.1.3) of the ligase family that activates the oxidation of complex fatty acids. Long chain fatty acyl-CoA synthetase catalyzes the formation of fatty acyl-CoA by a two-step process proceeding through an adenylated intermediate. The enzyme catalyzes the following reaction,

Fatty acid + CoA + ATP ⇌ Acyl-CoA + AMP + PP_{i}

It is present in all organisms from bacteria to humans. It catalyzes the pre-step reaction for β-oxidation of fatty acids or can be incorporated in phospholipids.

== Function ==
Long chain fatty acyl-CoA synthetase, LC-FACS, plays a role in the physiological regulation of various cellular functions via the production of long chain fatty acyl-CoA esters, which reportedly have affected protein transport, enzyme activation, protein acylation, cell signaling, and transcriptional regulation. The formation of fatty acyl-CoA is catalyzed in two steps: a stable intermediate of fatty acyl-AMP molecule and then the product is formed—fatty acid acyl-CoA molecule.

Fatty acyl CoA synthetase catalyzes the activation of a long fatty acid chain to a fatty acyl CoA, requiring the energy of 1 ATP to AMP and pyrophosphate. This step uses 2 "ATP equivalents" because pyrophosphate is cleaved into 2 molecules of inorganic phosphate, breaking a high-energy phosphate bond.

== Mechanism and active site ==
The mechanism for Long Chain Fatty Acyl-CoA Synthetase is a “bi uni uni bi ping-pong” mechanism. The uni and bi prefixes refer to the number of substrates that enter the enzyme and the number of products that leave the enzyme; bi describes a situation where two substrates enter the enzyme at the same time. Ping-pong signifies that a product is released before another substrate can bind to the enzyme.

In step one, ATP and a long chain fatty acid enter the enzyme's active site. Within the active site the negatively charged oxygen on the fatty acid attacks the alpha phosphate on ATP, forming an ATP-long chain fatty acid intermediate. (Step 1, Figure 2) In the second step, Pyrophosphate (PPi) leaves, resulting in an AMP-long chain fatty acid molecule within the enzyme's active site. (Step 2, Figure 2) Coenzyme A now enters the enzyme and another intermediate is formed which consists of AMP-long chain fatty acid-Coenzyme A. (Step 3, Figure 2) At the end of this mechanism two products are released, AMP and acyl coa product. (Step 4, Figure 2)

Acyl CoA is formed from long chain fatty acids through an acyl substitution. In an ATP dependent reaction, the fatty acid carboxylate is converted to a thioester. The final products of this reaction are acyl-CoA, pyrophosphate (PPi) and AMP.

Figure 1. Long chain Fatty acyl-CoA synthetase asymmetric unit showing active site residues Trp 234, Tyr504, and Glu540, along with the potentially supporting Asn450 residue.

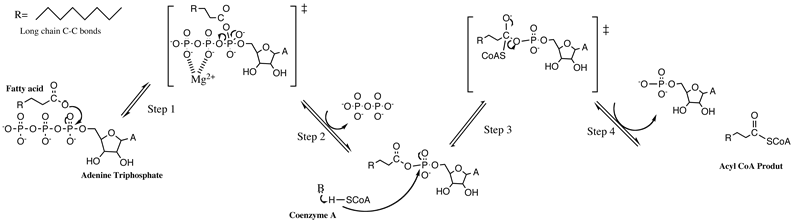
Figure 2. Mechanism of long chain fatty acyl-CoA synthetase.

== Structure ==
There are several highly conserved areas and a 20-30% amino acid sequence similarity between the members of this superfamily. The enzymes in the family consist of a large N-terminal and a small C-terminal domain, with the catalytic site positioned between the two domains. Substrate binding may affect the relative positions of the C- and N-terminal domains. The C-terminal domain of LC-FACS is assumed to be in an open conformation when a substrate is absent and in a closed conformation when a substrate is bound. The accessibility of the active site to solvent is reduced when the C- and N-terminal domains approach one another.

The structure-function relationship between LC-FACS and the formation and processing of the acyl-AMP intermediate was still unclear. A domain swapped dimer is formed by LC-FACS, with monomer interacting at the N-terminal domains. A large electrostatically positive concave is located at the back of the structure in the central valley of the homodimer. Asp15 forms an intermolecular salt bridge with Arg176 in the dimer interactions. An intermolecular hydrogen bond is formed between the main chain carbonyl group of Glu16and the side chain of Arg199. At the interface, Glu175 forms an intermolecular salt bridge with Arg199. The L motif, a six-amino acid peptide linker, connects the large N-terminal domain and a small C-terminal domain of each LC-FACS monomer. The N-terminal domain is composed of two subdomains: a distorted antiparallel β-barrel and two β-sheets surrounded by α-helices forming an αβαβα sandwich. The small C-terminal globular domain consists of two-stranded β-sheet and a three-stranded antiparallel β-sheet flanked by three α-helices.

=== Dimer interaction ===
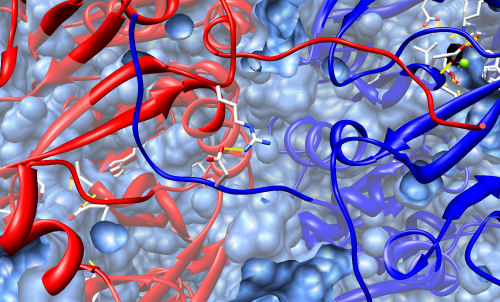
Figure 3. Dimerization of LC-FACS.

The dimerization of LC-FACS is stabilized through a salt bridge between Asp15 of sequence A and Arg176 of sequence B. Figure 3 shows this salt bridge between these two amino acids. The yellow line between Asp15 and Arg176 shows the salt bridge present.

=== ATP binding to the C-terminal domain ===
The conformations of the C-terminal domain of the LC-FACS structures are dependent on the presence of a ligand. AMP-PNP, a nonhydrolyzable ATP analogue, bound to LC-FACS results in the closed conformation with the C- and N-terminal domains directly interacting. In crystal structures, AMP-PNP is bound in a crevasse of each monomer at the interface between the N- and C-terminal domains. The closed conformation of the C-terminal domain is retained with myristroyl-AMP. Three residues in the C-terminal domain, Glu443, Glu475, and Lys527, interact noncovalently with L motif residues and the N-terminal domain to stabilize the closed conformation. There are two types of open conformations in the C-terminal domains of the uncomplexed structure. The C- and N-terminal domains do not interact directly for both monomers of the dimer. An extensive hydrogen bond network is used by the AMP moiety of the bound ATP molecule to hold the C- and N-terminal domains together.

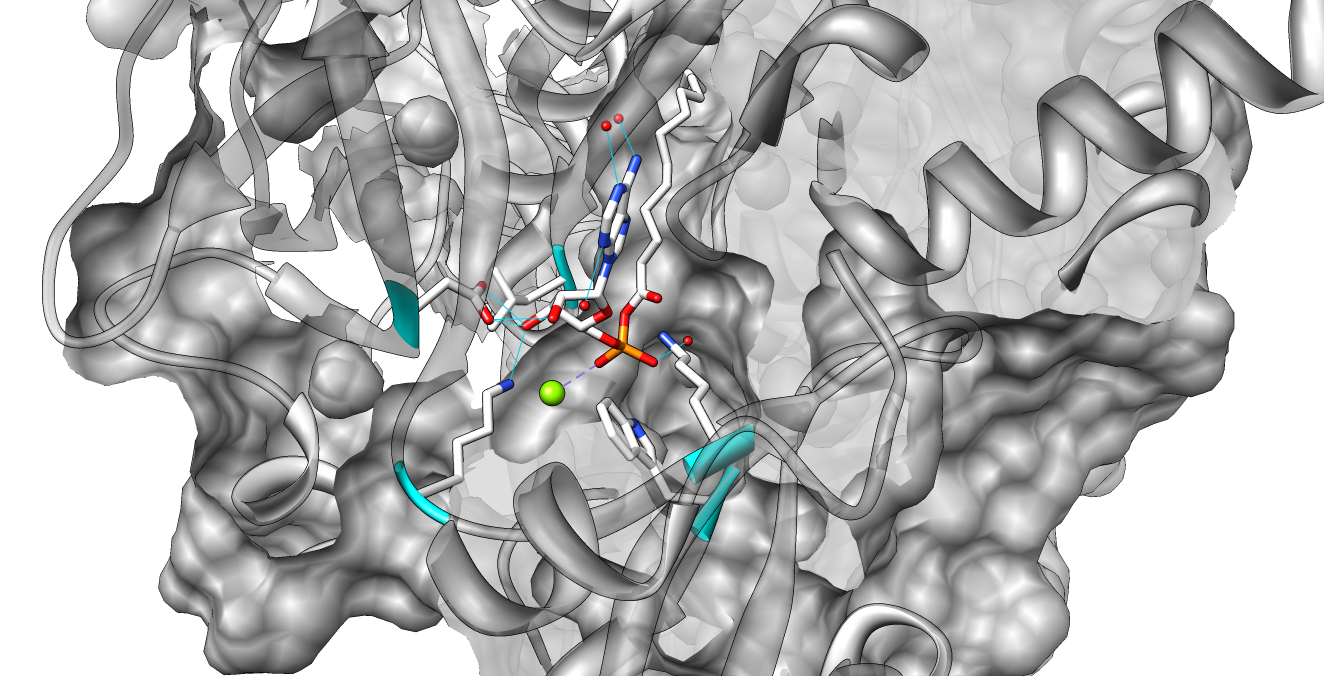
Figure 4. Active site of long chain fatty acyl-CoA synthetase with a long chain fatty acid. Trp444, Lys435 and Lys439 are the important residues

=== Fatty acid-binding tunnel ===
Bulkier long chain fatty acids are bound by a fatty acid-binding tunnel that is located in the N-terminal domain of each monomer. A large β-sheet and an α-helix cluster surround the tunnel which extends from the concave cavity in the central valley to the site of ATP-binding. There are two distinct paths in the large central pathway of the tunnel in the complex structure, which includes the “ATP path” and the “center path,” separated by the indole ring of Trp234 in the G motif. There is also another branch of the central pathway known as the “dead and branch.” The indole ring of Trp234 closes the fatty acid-binding tunnel in the uncomplexed structure. It opens up once AMP-PNP binds through hydrogen bond formation between β-phosphate and the nitrogen on the ring of Trp234. During this time, the closed conformation is adopted by the mobile C-terminal domain. There is a shift in the flexible loop of the G motif in the closed structures of LC-FACS, resulting in a wider dead end branch compared to the uncomplexed forms.

The ATP binding site is connected to an ATP path that is a hydrophobic channel in the fatty acid-binding tunnel. The fatty acid enters through the center path extending from the interface of the dimer along β-strand 13 to the ATP path. The connection between the two paths is blocked by the indole ring of Trp234 in the absence of ATP. Water molecules fill the center path in the AMP-PNP and myristoyl-AMP complex structures and through the entrance of the center path, they connect to the bulk solvent regions. The basic residues from each monomer, Lys219, Arg296, Arg297, Arg321, Lys350, and Lys 354, cause the entrance of the center path to generate a positive electrostatic potential. The dead end branch contains residues 235-243 and extends from the fatty acid-binding tunnel to α-helix h. The bottom of the dead end branch consists of a hydrophilic environment from the water molecules and polar side chains.

=== Domains ===
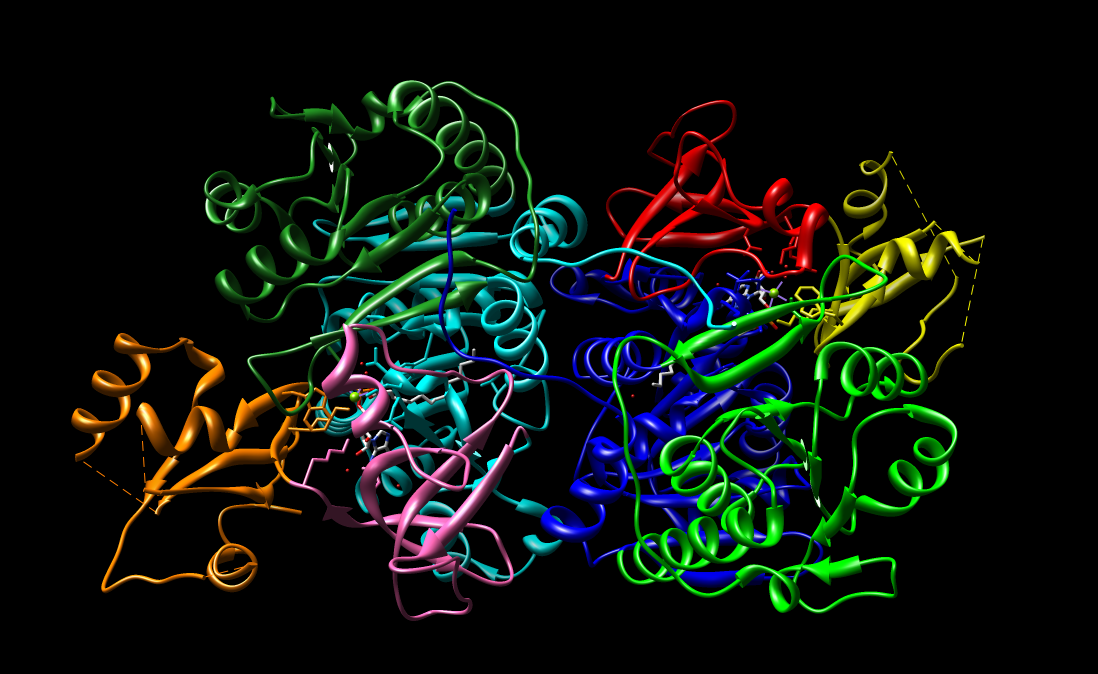
Figure 5.

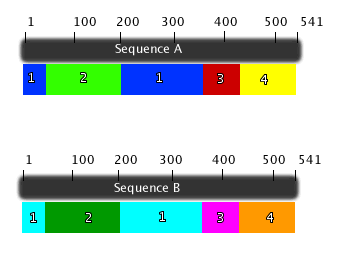
Figure 6.

The domains founds in Long chain fatty acyl CoA synthetase are shown both in the enzyme view (figure 5) and sequence view (figure 6). LC-FACS has five domains. After searching 1v26 in Entrez, the location of the 5 domains was shown and was used to create figure 5 and 6. The ribbons colors in figure 5 correspond to the colors of the figure 6.

== Inhibition by long chain fatty acyl-CoAs ==
A long term and short term regulation controls fatty acid synthesis. Long term fatty acid synthesis regulation is dependent on the rate of acetyl-CoA carboxylase (ACC) synthesis, the rate-limiting enzyme and first enzyme of the fatty acid synthesis, and fatty acid synthase (FAS), the second and major enzyme of the fatty acid synthesis. Cellular fatty acyl-CoA is involved in the short term regulation, but there is not a full understanding of the mechanisms.

Free fatty acids inhibits the de novo fatty acid synthesis and appears to be dependent on the formation of long chain fatty acyl-CoAs. Studies have shown that long chain fatty acyl-CoAs inhibit ACC and FAS via feedback inhibition. Long chain fatty acyl-CoA's inhibitory effect on the fatty acid synthesis may be a result of its regulation of lipogenic enzymes in a feedback manner through gene transcription suppression.

Long-chain fatty-acid-CoA ligase in cells catalytically synthesizes long chain fatty acyl-CoAs. Long-chain fatty-acid-CoA ligase may be involved in an important role in the suppression of fatty acid synthesis and it has been reported that it played a part in fatty acid synthesis inhibition. It was recently found that vitamin D_{3} upregulates FACL3, which forms long-chain fatty acid synthesis through the use of myristic acid, eicosapentaenoic acid (EPA), and arachidonic acid as substrates, in expression and activity levels. FACL3 contributes to vitamin D_{3} growth inhibitory effect in human prostate cancer LNCaP cells. A current study reports that the feedback inhibition of FAS expression by long chain fatty acyl-CoAs causes the downregulation of FAS mRNA by vitamin D_{3}.

== Clinical significance ==
Adrenoleukodystrophy (ALD) is the build up of long chain fatty acids in the brain and adrenal cortex, because of the decreased activity of long chain fatty acyl coa synthetase. The oxidation of the long chain fatty acids normally occurs in the peroxisome where the long chain fatty acyl coa synthetase is found. Long chain fatty acids enter the peroxisome via a transporter protein, ALDP, which creates a gate in the membrane of the peroxisome. In ALD the gene for this peroximal membrane transporter, ALDP, is defective, preventing long chain fatty acids from entering the peroxisome.

== Examples ==
Human genes encoding long-chain-fatty-acid—CoA ligase enzymes (also known as acyl-CoA synthetase long-chain, or ACSL) include:

- ACSL1
- ACSL3
- ACSL4
- ACSL5
- ACSL6
- SLC27A2

== See also ==
- Fatty acyl-CoA synthase
- Triacsin C - an inhibitor of Fatty acyl CoA synthetase
