= SUMO2 =

Protein-coding gene in the species Homo sapiens

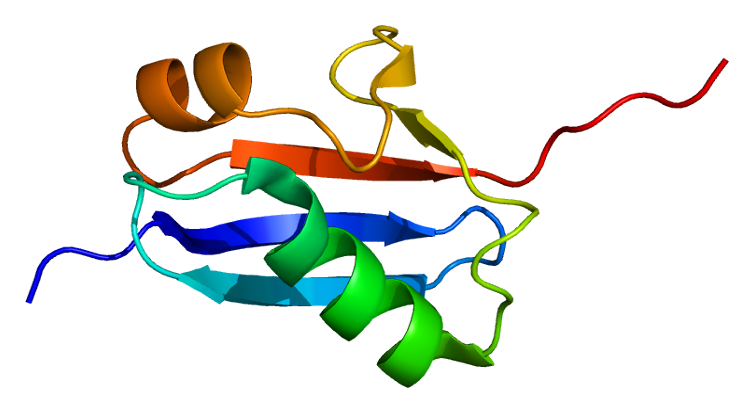

Identifiers
- Aliases: SUMO2, HSMT3, SMT3B, SMT3H2, SUMO3, Smt3A, small ubiquitin-like modifier 2, small ubiquitin like modifier 2
- External IDs: OMIM: 603042; MGI: 2158813; GeneCards: SUMO2
Available structures
PDB	Ortholog search: PDBe RCSB
PDB	List of PDB id codes 1WM2, 1WM3, 1WZ0, 2AWT, 2CKH, 2D07, 2IO0, 2IO3, 2IYD, 2RPQ, 3UIN, 3UIO, 3ZO5, 4BKG, 4NPN, 2N9E, 5D2M, 2N1W

Gene location (Human)
Chr.	Chromosome 17 (human)
Band	17q25.1	Start	75,165,586 bp
Band	17q25.1	End	75,182,959 bp

Gene location (Mouse)
Chr.	Chromosome 11 (mouse)
Band	11|11 E2	Start	115,413,928 bp
Band	11|11 E2	End	115,427,102 bp
RNA expression pattern
Bgee	Human / Mouse (ortholog); Top expressed in: ganglionic eminence; ventricular zone; mucosa of paranasal sinus; endothelial cell; lower lobe of lung; superficial temporal artery; islet of Langerhans; cerebellar vermis; oocyte; monocyte / Top expressed in: tail of embryo; morula; neural tube; mesencephalon; epiblast; ganglionic eminence; embryo; ventricular zone; genital tubercle; ovary; More reference expression data
BioGPS	n/a
Gene ontology
Molecular function	protein binding; ubiquitin protein ligase binding; protein tag; RNA binding; transcription corepressor binding; SUMO transferase activity; ubiquitin-like protein ligase binding
Cellular component	PML body; nucleus; nucleoplasm
Biological process	global genome nucleotide-excision repair; positive regulation of proteasomal ubiquitin-dependent protein catabolic process; protein sumoylation; positive regulation of transcription by RNA polymerase II
Sources:Amigo / QuickGO
Orthologs
Databases	NCBI: entry; OMA: entry
Species	Human	Mouse
Entrez	6613	170930
Ensembl	ENSG00000188612	ENSMUSG00000020738
UniProt	P61956	P61957
RefSeq (mRNA)	NM_001005849; NM_006937	NM_133354
RefSeq (protein)	NP_001005849; NP_008868	NP_579932
Location (UCSC)	Chr 17: 75.17 – 75.18 Mb	Chr 11: 115.41 – 115.43 Mb
PubMed search
- Wikidata
View/Edit Human	View/Edit Mouse

Small ubiquitin-related modifier 2 is a protein that in humans is encoded by the SUMO2 gene.

== Function ==
This gene encodes a protein that is a member of the SUMO (small ubiquitin-like modifier) protein family. It is a ubiquitin-like protein and functions in a manner similar to ubiquitin in that it is bound to target proteins as part of a post-translational modification system. However, unlike ubiquitin, which is primarily associated with targeting proteins for proteasomal degradation, SUMO2 is involved in a variety of cellular processes, such as nuclear transport, transcriptional regulation, apoptosis, and protein stability. It is not active until the last two amino acids of the carboxy-terminus have been cleaved off. Numerous pseudogenes have been reported for this gene. Alternate transcriptional splice variants encoding different isoforms have been characterized.

== Interactions ==
SUMO2 has been shown to interact with TRIM63 and CFAP298.

== Clinical significance ==
Deep hypothermia protects the brain from ischemic injury, which is why it's employed for major cardiovascular procedures that necessitate cardiopulmonary bypass and a period of circulatory arrest. With an experiment conducted to moderate hypothermia, small ubiquitin-like modifier (SUMO1-3) conjugation was significantly activated in the brain. The effects of hypothermia on SUMO conjugation were evaluated in this experiment using Western blot and immunohistochemistry in animals that were either normothermic (37 °C) or deep to moderate (18 °C, 24 °C, 30 °C) hypothermic cardiopulmonary bypass. In these cells, even 30 °C hypothermia was enough to significantly boost SUMO2/3-conjugated protein levels and nucleus accumulation. Deep hypothermia caused the SUMO-conjugating enzyme Ubc9 to translocate to the nucleus, implying that the increase in nuclear levels of SUMO2/3-conjugated proteins seen in hypothermic animals' brains is an active process. Deep hypothermia caused only a small increase in the amounts of SUMO2/3-conjugated proteins in primary neuronal cells. This shows that neurons in vivo have a greater capacity to activate this endogenous possibly neuroprotective mechanism when exposed to hypothermia than neurons in vitro. Identifying proteins that are SUMO2/3 conjugated during hypothermia could aid in the development of new preventive and therapeutic therapies to make neurons more resistant to a transient blood supply interruption.
