= ACSL3 =

Protein-coding gene in humans

Identifiers
- Aliases: ACSL3, ACS3, FACL3, PRO2194, acyl-CoA synthetase long-chain family member 3, acyl-CoA synthetase long chain family member 3, LACS3, LACS 3
- External IDs: OMIM: 602371; MGI: 1921455; GeneCards: ACSL3
Enzyme activity
EC #	BRENDA	ExPASy	KEGG	MetaCyc
6.2.1.2	↗	↗	↗	↗
6.2.1.3	↗	↗	↗	↗
6.2.1.15	↗	↗	↗	↗

Gene location (Human)
Chr.	Chromosome 2 (human)
Band	2q36.1	Start	222,860,942 bp
Band	2q36.1	End	222,944,639 bp

Gene location (Mouse)
Chr.	Chromosome 1 (mouse)
Band	1 C4|1 40.84 cM	Start	78,635,542 bp
Band	1 C4|1 40.84 cM	End	78,685,460 bp
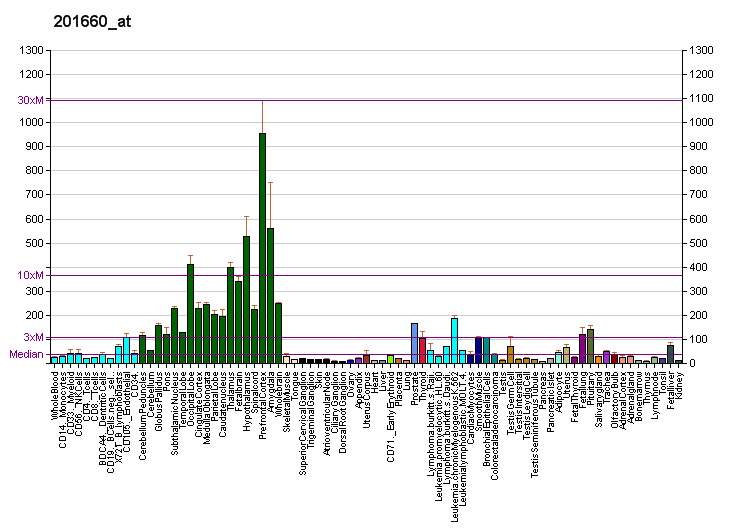

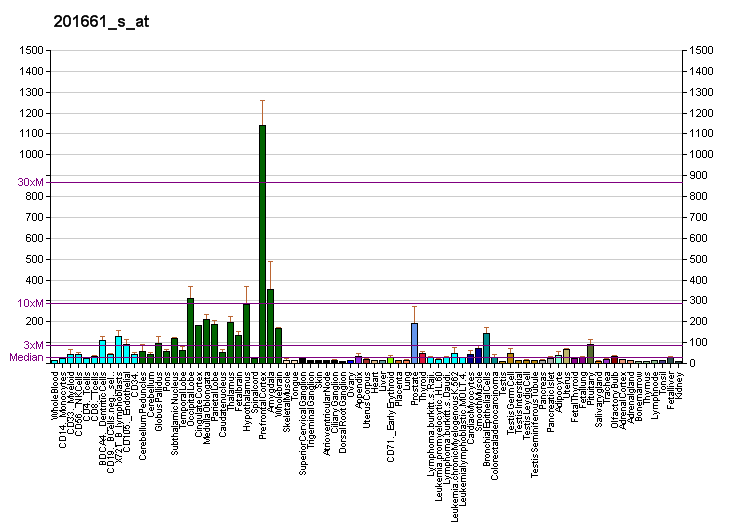

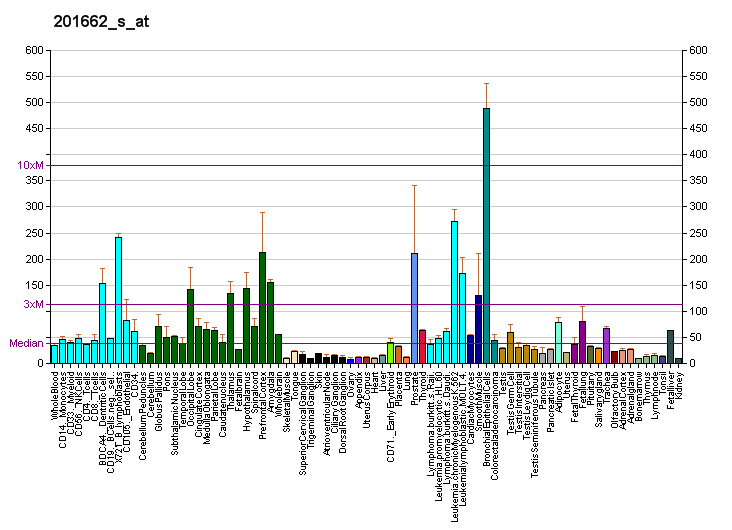
RNA expression pattern
Bgee	Human / Mouse (ortholog); Top expressed in: endothelial cell; lateral nuclear group of thalamus; Brodmann area 23; Brodmann area 10; Brodmann area 46; cartilage tissue; frontal pole; postcentral gyrus; pars compacta; pars reticulata / Top expressed in: otolith organ; utricle; neural layer of retina; medial dorsal nucleus; epithelium of small intestine; medial geniculate nucleus; suprachiasmatic nucleus; spermatocyte; deep cerebellar nuclei; ventral tegmental area; More reference expression data
BioGPS	More reference expression data
Gene ontology
Molecular function	nucleotide binding; protein domain specific binding; ligase activity; catalytic activity; ATP binding; protein kinase binding; long-chain fatty acid-CoA ligase activity; decanoate-CoA ligase activity
Cellular component	organelle membrane; integral component of membrane; Golgi apparatus; endoplasmic reticulum membrane; membrane; intracellular membrane-bounded organelle; lipid droplet; peroxisomal membrane; peroxisome; mitochondrial outer membrane; endoplasmic reticulum; mitochondrion; perinuclear region of cytoplasm
Biological process	positive regulation of Golgi to plasma membrane protein transport; response to organic cyclic compound; response to nutrient; lipid metabolism; fatty acid metabolic process; brain development; fatty acid biosynthetic process; long-chain fatty-acyl-CoA biosynthetic process; positive regulation of secretion; long-chain fatty acid import into cell; very-low-density lipoprotein particle assembly; metabolism; long-chain fatty acid metabolic process; positive regulation of phosphatidylcholine biosynthetic process
Sources:Amigo / QuickGO
Orthologs
Databases	NCBI: entry; OMA: entry
Species	Human	Mouse
Entrez	2181	74205
Ensembl	ENSG00000123983	ENSMUSG00000032883
UniProt	O95573	Q9CZW4
RefSeq (mRNA)	NM_004457; NM_203372; NM_001354158; NM_001354159	NM_001033606; NM_001136222; NM_028817
RefSeq (protein)	NP_004448; NP_976251; NP_001341087; NP_001341088	NP_001028778; NP_001129694; NP_083093
Location (UCSC)	Chr 2: 222.86 – 222.94 Mb	Chr 1: 78.64 – 78.69 Mb
PubMed search
- Wikidata
View/Edit Human	View/Edit Mouse

Long-chain-fatty-acid—CoA ligase 3 is an enzyme that in humans is encoded by the ACSL3 gene.

== Function ==
The protein encoded by this gene is an isozyme of the long-chain fatty-acid-coenzyme A ligase family. Although differing in substrate specificity, subcellular localization, and tissue distribution, all isozymes of this family convert free long-chain fatty acids into fatty acyl-CoA esters, and thereby play a key role in lipid biosynthesis and fatty acid degradation. This isozyme is highly expressed in brain, and preferentially utilizes myristate, arachidonate, and eicosapentaenoate as substrates. The amino acid sequence of this isozyme is 92% identical to that of rat homolog. Two transcript variants encoding the same protein have been found for this gene.
