= SPART =

Protein-coding gene in the species Homo sapiens

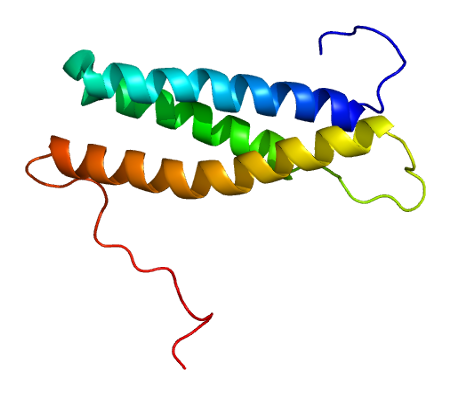

Identifiers
- Aliases: SPART, SPARTIN, TAHCCP1, SPG20, spastic paraplegia 20 (Troyer syndrome)
- External IDs: OMIM: 607111; MGI: 2139806; GeneCards: SPART
Available structures
PDB	Ortholog search: PDBe RCSB
PDB	List of PDB id codes 2DL1, 4U7I

Gene location (Human)
Chr.	Chromosome 13 (human)
Band	13q13.3	Start	36,301,638 bp
Band	13q13.3	End	36,370,180 bp

Gene location (Mouse)
Chr.	Chromosome 3 (mouse)
Band	3|3 C	Start	55,019,529 bp
Band	3|3 C	End	55,044,743 bp
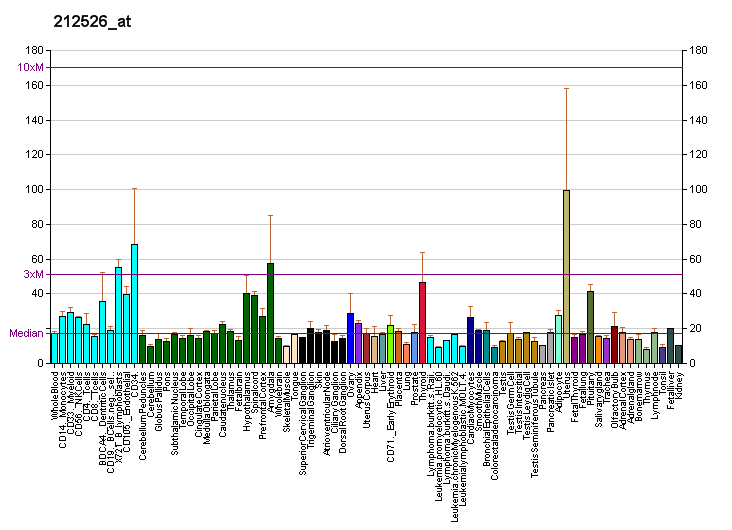

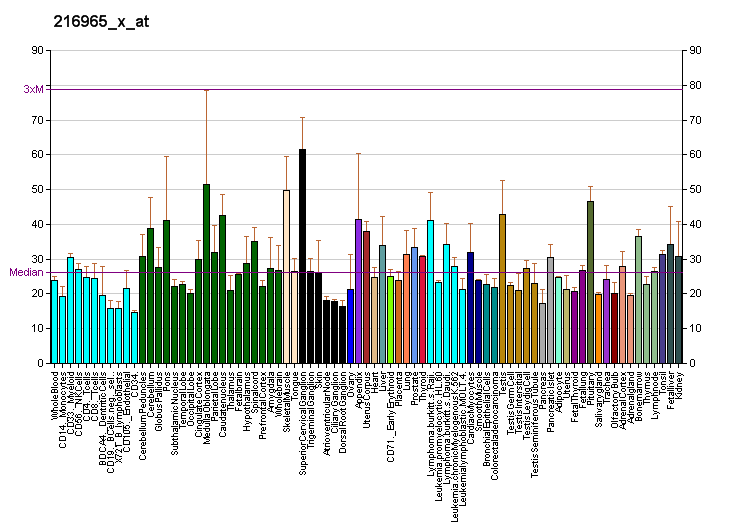
RNA expression pattern
Bgee	Human / Mouse (ortholog); Top expressed in: Achilles tendon; left ovary; right ovary; canal of the cervix; left uterine tube; popliteal artery; tibial arteries; right adrenal cortex; stromal cell of endometrium; left adrenal gland / Top expressed in: zygote; endothelial cell of lymphatic vessel; secondary oocyte; tail of embryo; genital tubercle; mandibular prominence; calvaria; lens; otic vesicle; aortic valve; More reference expression data
BioGPS	More reference expression data
Gene ontology
Molecular function	protein binding; ubiquitin protein ligase binding
Cellular component	mitochondrial outer membrane; lipid droplet; plasma membrane; synapse; cytoplasm; midbody; cytosol
Biological process	cell division; regulation of mitochondrial membrane potential; negative regulation of collateral sprouting in absence of injury; adipose tissue development; neuromuscular process; abscission; lipid droplet organization; negative regulation of BMP signaling pathway
Sources:Amigo / QuickGO
Orthologs
Databases	NCBI: entry; OMA: entry
Species	Human	Mouse
Entrez	23111	229285
Ensembl	ENSG00000133104	ENSMUSG00000036580
UniProt	Q8N0X7	Q8R1X6
RefSeq (mRNA)	NM_001142294; NM_001142295; NM_001142296; NM_015087	NM_001144987; NM_001144988; NM_144895
RefSeq (protein)	NP_001135766; NP_001135767; NP_001135768; NP_055902; NP_001135766.1 NP_001135767.1; NP_001135768.1; NP_055902.1	NP_001138459; NP_001138460; NP_659144
Location (UCSC)	Chr 13: 36.3 – 36.37 Mb	Chr 3: 55.02 – 55.04 Mb
PubMed search
- Wikidata
View/Edit Human	View/Edit Mouse

Spartin is a protein that in humans is encoded by the SPART gene (previously SPG20).

This gene encodes a protein that contains a MIT (Microtubule Interacting and Trafficking molecule) domain. This protein may be involved in endosomal trafficking, microtubule dynamics, or both functions. Spartin loss has been associated to mitochondrial dysfunction, impaired complex I activity and altered pyruvate metabolism. Frameshift mutations associated with this gene cause autosomal recessive spastic paraplegia 20 (Troyer syndrome). Troyer syndrome (SPG20) is a complicated type of hereditary spastic paraplegias (HSPs). HSP is a category of neurological disorder characterized by spasticity and muscle weakness in the lower limbs.

== Background ==
The original description of this gene mutation and associated symptoms were described in 1967. This mutation is commonly found in high frequency with the Amish population. Newer studies have found that the mutation is not isolated to the Amish population, but also resides in the Omani population.

== Presentation ==
This syndrome is not only characterized by spasticity and weakness in the lower limbs, but also with dysarthria, mental retardation or mild developmental delay, and muscle wasting or muscle atrophy.

=== Physical ===
Individuals appear to have difficulty walking, and report a clumsy, spastic gait which worsens over time. Some additional common physical features include overgrowth of the jaw bone, hammer toes, hand and feet abnormalities, and pes cavus.

=== Cognitive ===
Cognitive challenges, including developmental delay and difficulty with performance in school, may affect individuals with this syndrome.

=== Neurologic ===
Neurologic examination of individuals with this mutation may show dysmetria in the upper extremities, hyperreflexia, distal amyotrophy and ankle clonus, in addition to spasticity, weakness and dysarthria.

=== Diagnostic Imaging ===
The cerebellar vermis may present with mild atrophy and a loss of white matter volume.

=== Through Lifespan ===
Facial dysmorphism and subtle skeletal features are common in younger children. The condition progressively worsens, as spasticity and distal amyotrophy symptoms are revealed more in teenage years. SPART expression in the adult is relatively modest, however it is widespread in the nervous system. Longitudinal comparison of magnetic resonance imaging concluded that there was a progression of the syndrome; thus, the condition appears to worsen over time.
