= Immunoglobulin I-set domain =

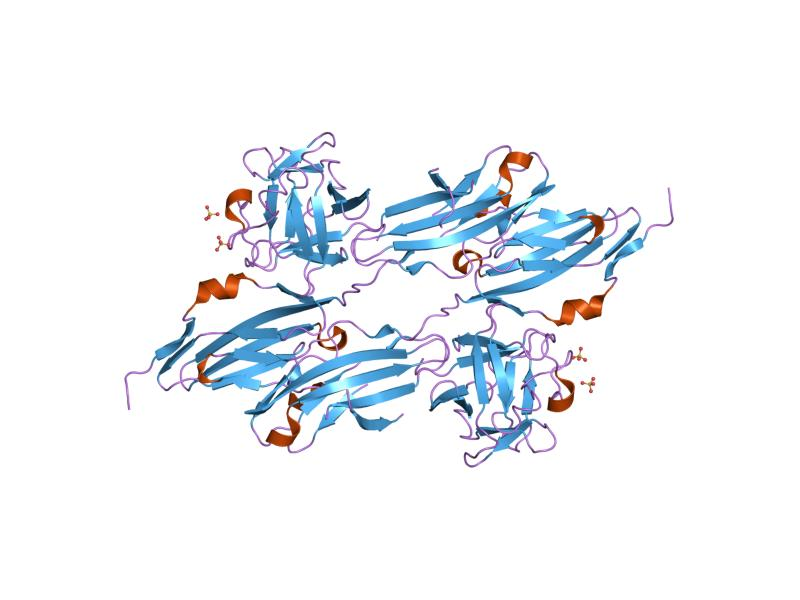
- Structures of fibroblast growth factor 1.

Identifiers
- Symbol: I-set
- Pfam: PF07679
- InterPro: IPR013098
Available protein structures:
- PDB: 1bihB:327-412 1cs6A:322-407 1cvsC:159-247 1epfB:20-114 1evtD:159-247 1fhgA:42-132 1fq9C:159-247 1gxeA:652-767 1ie5A:214-304 1ij9A:25-112 1koa:6585-6674 1pd6A:363-448 1qctE:153-241 1qz1A:214-305 1ry7B:157-245 1tlk:42-132 1tnm:33489-3357 1tnn:33489-3357 1u2hA:43-113 1vcaA:25-112 1vscA:25-112 1wf5A:306-320 1wit:4150-4239 1wiu:4150-4239 1wwcA:325-352 1x44A:342-430 2cqvA:1238-1327 2cryA:419-516 2ncm:20-114 IPR013098 PF07679 (ECOD; PDBsum)
- AlphaFold: IPR013098; PF07679

I-set domains are found in several cell adhesion molecules, including vascular (VCAM), intercellular (ICAM), neural (NCAM) and mucosal addressin (MADCAM) cell adhesion molecules, as well as junction adhesion molecules (JAM). I-set domains are also present in several other diverse protein families, including several tyrosine-protein kinase receptors, the hemolymph protein hemolin, the muscle proteins titin, telokin, and twitchin, the neuronal adhesion molecule axonin-1, and the signalling molecule semaphorin 4D that is involved in axonal guidance, immune function and angiogenesis.

== Human proteins containing this domain ==
- ADAMTSL1, ADAMTSL3, ALPK3, AXL,
- BOC,
- C9orf94, CADM2, CADM4, CCDC141, CDON, CEACAM7, CHL1, CILP2, CNTN1, CNTN2, CNTN3, CNTN4, CNTN5, CNTN6, CXADR,
- DCC, DSCAM, DSCAML1,
- ESAM,
- FGFR1, FGFR3, FGFR4, FGFRL1, FLT1, FLT4, FSTL4, FSTL5,
- HMCN1, HNT, HSPG2,
- ICAM5, IGFBP7, IGFBPL1, IGSF10, IGSF22, IGSF9, ISLR,
- KALRN, KAZALD1, KDR, KIAA0626, KIRREL, KIRREL2, KIRREL3,
- L1CAM, LINGO1, LINGO2, LRFN2, LRFN3, LRFN4, LRFN5, LRIG1, LRIG2, LRIG3, LRIT2, LRIT3, LRRC24, LRRC4B, LRRC4C, LRRN1, LRRN3, LRRN5, LSAMP,
- MAG, MDGA2, MFAP3L, MUSK, MXRA5, MYBPC1, MYBPC2, MYBPC3, MYBPH, MYBPHL, MYLK, MYOM1, MYOM2, MYOM3, MYOT, MYPN,
- NCAM1, NCAM2, NEGR1, NEO1, NEXN, NFASC, NGL1, NOPE, NPHS1, NPTN, NRCAM, NRG2, NT, NTRK2, NTRK3,
- OBSCN, OBSL1, OPCML,
- PALLD, PAPLN, PDGFRA, PRODH2, PTK7, PTPRD, PTPRF, PTPRS, PTPsigma, PUNC,
- ROBO1, ROBO2, ROBO3, ROBO4, ROR1, ROR2,
- SDK1, SDK2, SIGLEC1, SIGLEC6, SPEG,
- TRIO, TTN,
- UNC5A, UNC5B, UNC5C,
- VCAM1, WFIKKN1, WFIKKN2,
