= Contactin =

Contactins are a subgroup of molecules belonging to the immunoglobulin superfamily that are expressed exclusively in the nervous system, as well as in the conduction system of the heart. These proteins are attached to the neuronal membrane by a GPI-anchor. The subgroup consists of six members now referred to as contactin 1-6, but historically they had different names as shown in the table below:

New name	Old name
Contactin 1	Contactin
Contactin 2	TAG-1
Contactin 3	BIG-1
Contactin 4	BIG-2
Contactin 5	NB-2
Contactin 6	NB-3
