= ISLR =

Protein-coding gene in the species Homo sapiens

Identifiers
- Aliases: ISLR, HsT17563, Meflin, immunoglobulin superfamily containing leucine-rich repeat, immunoglobulin superfamily containing leucine rich repeat
- External IDs: OMIM: 602059; MGI: 1349645; GeneCards: ISLR

Gene location (Human)
Chr.	Chromosome 15 (human)
Band	15q24.1	Start	74,173,710 bp
Band	15q24.1	End	74,176,872 bp

Gene location (Mouse)
Chr.	Chromosome 9 (mouse)
Band	9|9 B	Start	58,063,551 bp
Band	9|9 B	End	58,111,589 bp
RNA expression pattern
Bgee	Human / Mouse (ortholog); Top expressed in: Achilles tendon; body of uterus; canal of the cervix; stromal cell of endometrium; myometrium; right coronary artery; left ovary; right ovary; left uterine tube; gallbladder / Top expressed in: calvaria; optic nerve; internal carotid artery; efferent ductule; aortic valve; external carotid artery; ascending aorta; median eminence; Gonadal ridge; body of femur; More reference expression data
BioGPS	n/a
Orthologs
Databases	NCBI: entry; OMA: entry
Species	Human	Mouse
Entrez	3671	26968
Ensembl	ENSG00000129009; ENSG00000288508	ENSMUSG00000037206
UniProt	O14498	Q6GU68
RefSeq (mRNA)	NM_201526; NM_005545	NM_001195431; NM_012043
RefSeq (protein)	NP_005536; NP_958934	NP_001182360; NP_036173
Location (UCSC)	Chr 15: 74.17 – 74.18 Mb	Chr 9: 58.06 – 58.11 Mb
PubMed search
- Wikidata
View/Edit Human	View/Edit Mouse

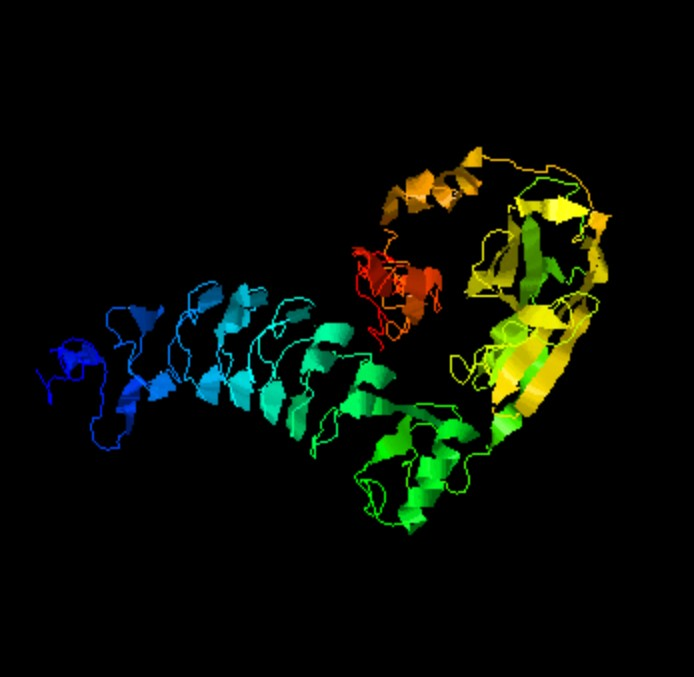
Figure 1. Predicted Protein ISLR Tertiary Structure by i-TASSER Estimated TM-Score = 0.47±0.15 Estimated RMSD = 11.8±4.5Å

In humans, the immunoglobulin super family containing leucine-rich repeat (ISLR) protein is encoded by the ISLR gene. Current RNA-seq studies show that the protein is highly expressed in the endometrium and ovary and shows expression among 25 other tissues. The protein is seen localized in the cytoplasm, plasma membrane, extracellular exosome, and platelet alpha granule lumen. Furthermore, the protein is known to play a role in platelet degranulation, cell adhesion, and response to elevated platelet cytosolic Ca^{2+}.

== Gene ==
The aliases for ISLR are Meflin, HsT17563, and mesenchymal stromal-cell and fibroblast-expressing Linx paralogue. The gene is part of the I-set family.

The most updated annotation shows the gene spanning from 74,173,710 to 74,176,871 base pairs (3,161 bp) with location on the plus strand at position 15q24.1 (Chromosome 15). The gene contains 3 exons and 4 distinct introns.

== Transcription ==
=== Known transcript variants ===
The ISLR gene has two known transcript variants on the plus strand: ISLR transcript variant 1 and ISLR transcript variant 2. Both variants encode for the same protein.

Transcript variant 1 is the longer variant with a length of 2,331 bp and contains 2 exons.

Transcript variant 2 is the shorter variant with a length of 2,128 bp and contains 2 exons. This variant differs in the 5' UTR compared to variant 1.

== Protein ==
=== Physical features ===
The human gene of ISLR has two alternatively spliced identical isoforms. The domains of the ISLR gene follows as: LRR_8 (leucine-rich repeat), LRR_RI (ribonuclease inhibitor), PCC (polycystin cation channel protein) Super family, and Ig (immunoglobulin).

The predicted isoelectric point of unmodified protein ISLR is 5.3. The calculated molar mass is 46.0 kDa.

The ISLR protein has 428 amino acids (aa) in humans. Through the Statistical Analysis of Protein Sequences (SAPS) tool, the percentage of most amino acid residues is about its average percentage among human proteins except leucine which shows high abundance compared to a normal protein. This is expected with the gene containing multiple LRR (leucine-rich repeats) structural motifs. There is a significantly low abundance of methionine (predicted to be 0.5%). In summary, the positively charged amino acid residues overcounts the negatively charged amino acid residues.

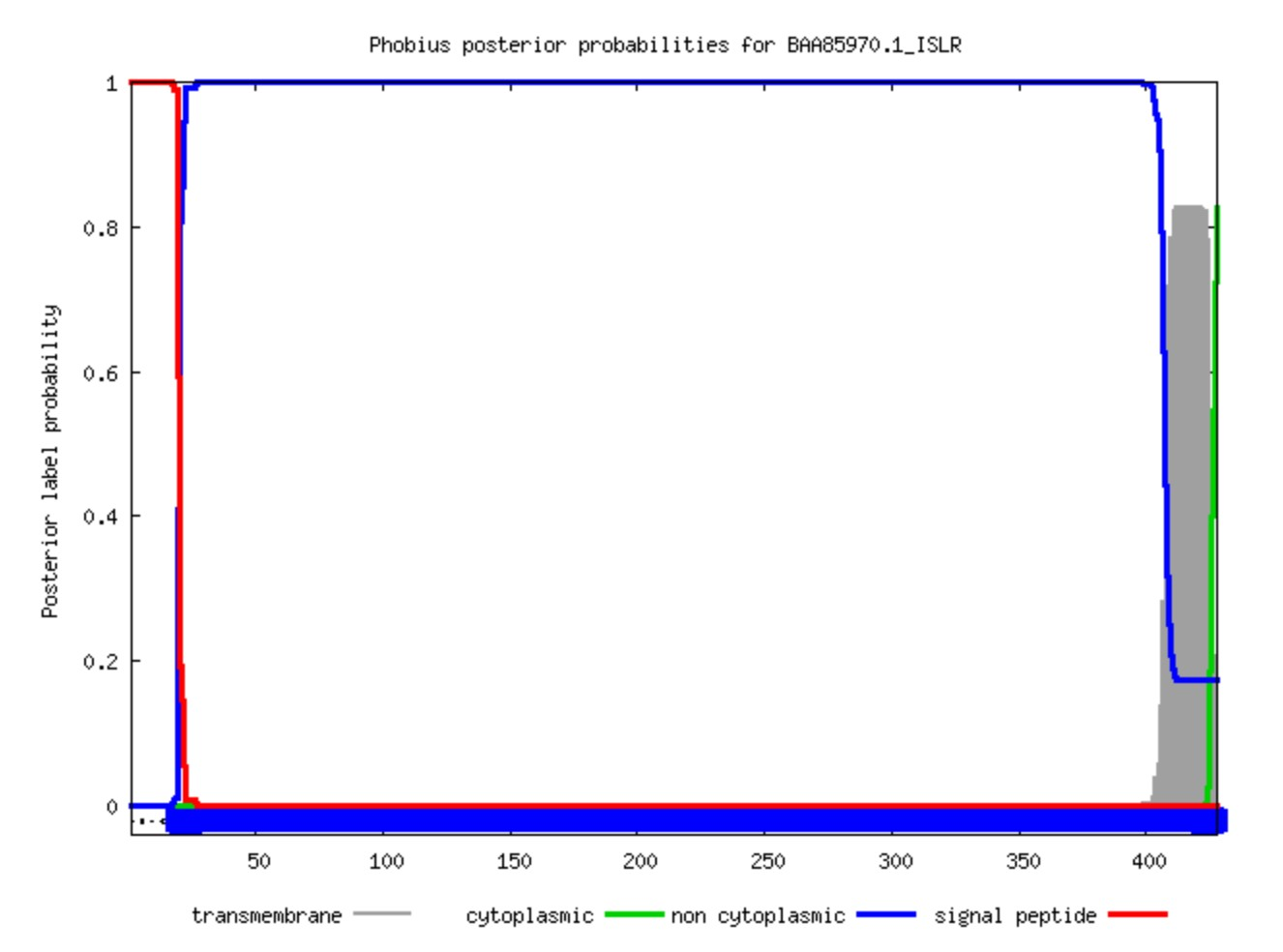
Figure 2. Phobius Prediction of Signal Peptide and Transmembrane Domain

Through SAPS tool, there are two predicted identical four-block length repetitive structures that fall within LRR structural motifs: LSHL at 97-100 bp and 172-175 bp.

One high-scoring transmembrane segment was predicted through the SAPS tool from 411 to 428 aa (length 18) with a pocket from 417 to 418 aa. The Phobius prediction for the ISLR protein sequence illustrated the potential transmembrane domain and a signal peptide (Figure 2). The SignalP-5.0 prediction for the signal peptide reported a likelihood of 0.9989 with a cleavage site between position 18 and 19 with the probability of 0.9146.

=== Post-translational modifications ===
Phosphorylation Sites

There are 31 predicted phosphorylation sites in the protein sequence for ISLR in humans from NetPhos. The results were filtered for best predictions for each residue display and accounted for serine, threonine, and tyrosine.

Through Eukaryotic Structural Motif (ELM tool) predictions, eight distinct phosphorylation sites were identified for the protein:

1. Glycogen synthase kinase-3 (GSK3) phosphorylation site at position 234-241 aa.
2. Phosphatidylinositol 3-kinase related kinase (PIKK) phosphorylation site at position 238-244 aa.
3. Casein kinase (CK1) phosphorylation site at position 335-341 aa.
4. Two CK2 phosphorylation sites at positions 343-349 aa and 376-382 aa.
5. Proline-Directed (MAPK) phosphorylation site at position 343-349 aa.
6. Polo-like kinase phosphosites 1 (Plk1) at positions 336-342 aa and 351-357 aa. Ser/Thr residues are phosphorylated by the kinase.
7. Plk4 phosphosite at position 415-421 aa. Ser/Thr residues are phosphorylated by the kinase.
8. Two NEK2 phosphorylation sites at positions 415-420 bp and 423-428 aa.

Post-Translational Modifications predicted by Eukaryotic Structural Motif (ELM) Prediction in human ISLR protein
Name	Position (aa)	Cell Compartment(s)
N-degron	1-3	Cytosol
Endosome-Lysosome-Basolateral sorting signals	2-7	Cytosol, Endocytic vesicle
Nuclear Export Signal (NES)	3-17	Nucleus, cytosol
Phosphotyrosine ligands bound by Src Homology 2 (SH2) domains	238-241	Cytosol
Class IV WW domain ligands	343-348	Cytosol, nucleus
Cyclin-dependent kinase subunit 1 (Cks1) ligand	344-349	Cytosol, nucleus
TNFR-associated factors 6 (TRAF6) binding site	345-353	Cytosol
Peptide Amidation Site	355-358	Extracellular, secretory granule
di-Arg retention/retrieving signal	357-359	Endoplasmic reticulum membrane, ER-Golgi transport vesicle membrane, rough endoplasmic reticulum, endoplasmic reticulum cisterna, cytosol, integral protein
N-arginine dibasic (NRD) cleavage site	357-359	Extracellular, Golgi apparatus, cell surface
Src Homology 3 (SH3) ligand	375-381	Plasma membrane, focal adhesion, cytosol
Glycosaminoglycan attachment site	379-381	Extracellular, Golgi apparatus
STAT5 SH2 domain binding motif	370-373 389-392	Cytosol
PDZ domain ligands	423-428	Cytosol, internal side of plasma membrane
Pex14 ligand motif	424-428	Cytosol, peroxisome, glycosome

Table 1. Results of ELM motif search after context, structural, and globular domain filtering with acceptable structural score (above medium threshold score). There are 23 total identified post-translational modifications including phosphorylation sites in the human protein of ISLR.

Glycosylation Sites

Through the Simple Modular Architecture Research (SMART) tool in Figure 3, an annotation predicted three N-linked glycosylation sites (red circles, starting from the left): 51 aa, 60 aa, and 309 aa. The LRR structural motifs and immunoglobulin C-2 type (IGc2) domain are shown in the diagram (Figure 3).

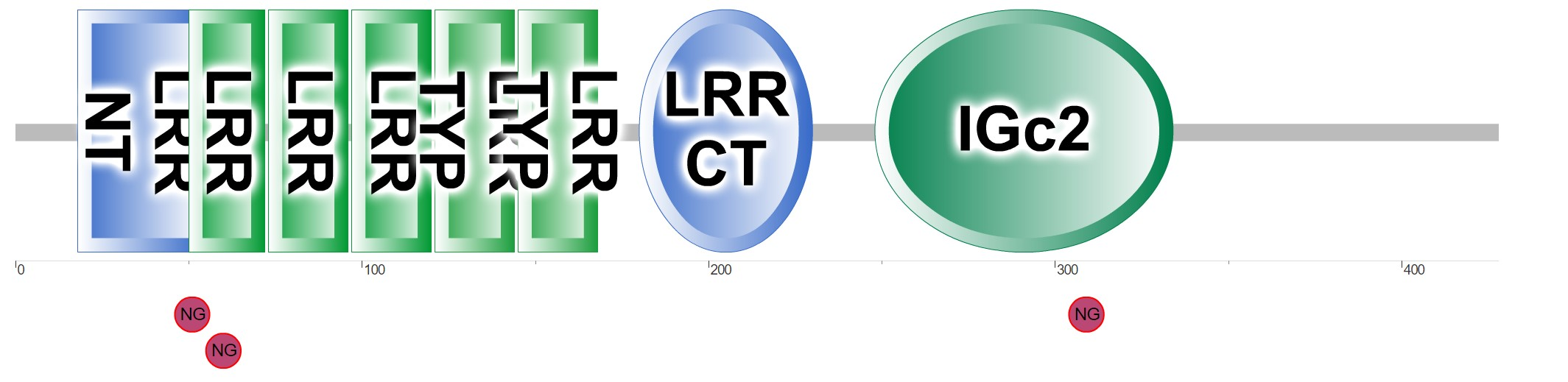
Figure 3. Predicted N-linked Glycosylation sites in SMART for human ISLR protein. The three PTMs are N-linked glycosylation (propagated, red circles).

Amidation Sites

Predicted with MyHits which investigates relationships between protein sequences and motifs, an amidation site motif was confidently predicted at position 355-358 aa.

Palmitoylation sites

Three palmitoylation sites were predicted (Table 2).

Predicted Palmitoylation sites in CSS-Palm for the ISLR human protein
Position	Peptide	Score	Cutoff
19	LLGLAQACPEPCDCG	21.194	3.717
23	AQACPEPCDCGEKYG	13.22	10.722
25	ACPEPCDCGEKYGFQ	4.463	3.717

Table 2. Results of the CSS-Palm for the human protein of ISLR.

GPI-Modifications

Predicted with big-PI predictor, one glucose phosphate isomerase (GPI) modification was found at position 401 aa (best site) with P-value score of 1.71e-03.

=== Secondary and Tertiary Structure ===
Of all the predicted beta sheets, four stretches at 253-260 aa, 265-272 aa, 323-331 aa, and 335-346 aa were identified with high confidence using CFSSP and Phyre2. Of all the predicted alpha helices, three alpha helices at 5-15 aa, 189-195 aa, and 214-216 aa were identified with high confidence as well. A tertiary model of the human ISLR protein predicted by I-TASSER shows a combination of some alpha helices and beta sheets (Figure 1). Based on the secondary structure prediction of the protein in I-TASSER, the locations of the four beta sheets and three alpha helices confirms the predictions of high confidence made by CFSSP and Phyre2.

=== Subcellular Localization ===
The ISLR protein in humans is expected to localize throughout a cell, including extracellular region, based on the predicted results of PSORT II. The Reinhardt's method for cytoplasmic/nuclear discrimination predicted the protein to be more cytoplasmic with a reliability of 76.7. Additionally, ISLR was shown to localize in the cytoplasm based on the polyclonal antibody results in immunohistochemically stained human tissues in myocytes, glandular cells, skin, hepatocytes. Immunofluorescent staining of ISLR in human cell line BJ (fibroblasts) showed localization to the plasma membrane using ISLR Polyclonal Antibody as well.

== Expression ==
In humans, RNA-seq was conducted on tissue samples from 95 individuals representing 27 different tissues to determine tissue-specificity of all protein-coding genes. Notably, there is high expression of ISLR in endometrium and ovary and visible expression among 25 other tissues. Another study of RNA Sequencing of total RNA from 20 human tissues demonstrated high expression of ISLR in uterus. Tissue-specific circular RNA induction during human fetal development showed steady expression of ISLR throughout the development with a high increase at 10 weeks for stomach. Expression remained notably high to 20 weeks for stomach.

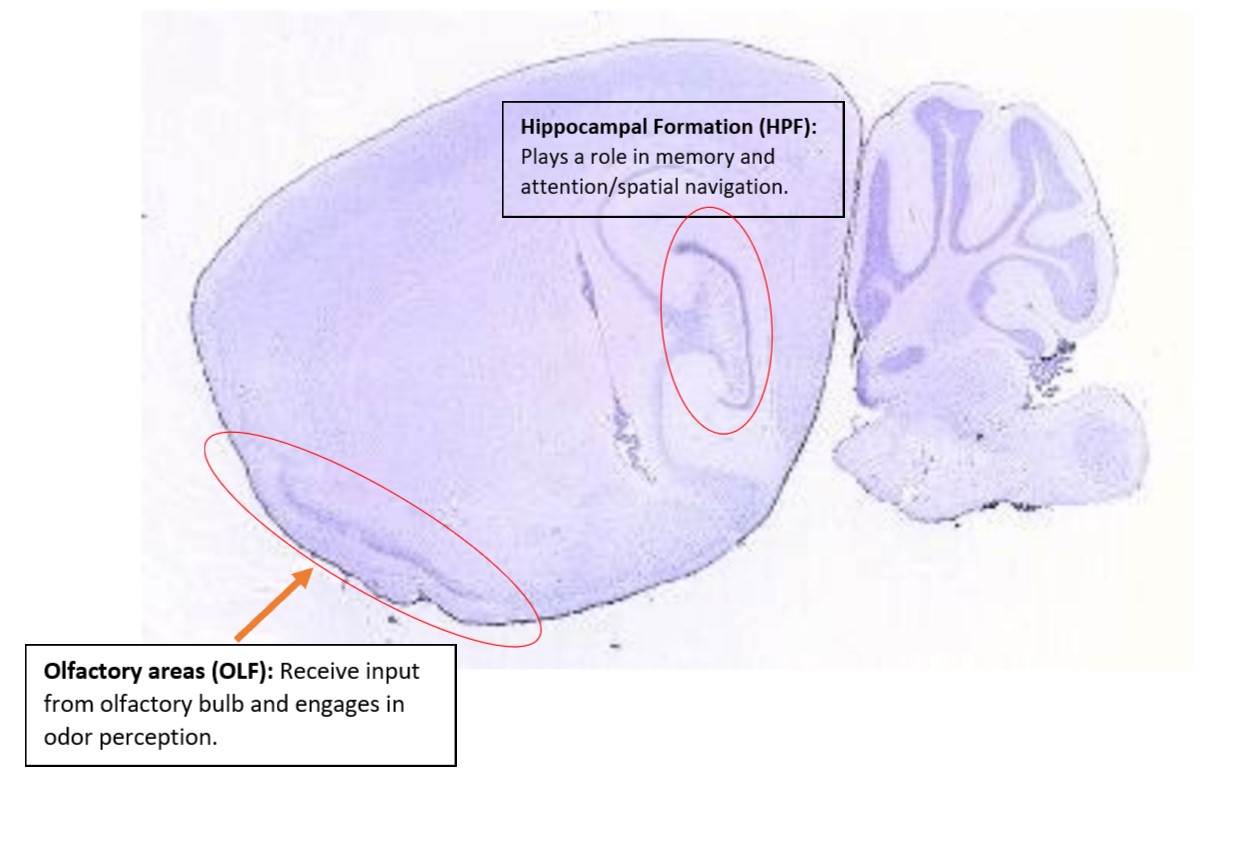
Figure 4. In situ Hybridization on Mouse Brain. Sagittal cut. IHC stained 5 for ISLR expression. Two raw expression values were found: (a) Olfactory areas with 3.18 and (b) Hippocampal formation with 1.10.

In the annotated figure, an in situ Hybridization on a 56-days old male mouse brain (sagittal cut) demonstrated expression in the olfactory areas and hippocampal formation (Figure 4).

Based on Protein Abundance Database (PAXdb 4.1), the human protein of ISLR is shown with high protein abundance (ppm value > 1) relative to the whole organism.

=== Expression in Clinical Studies ===
Expression profiling by microarray of ISLR in female human subjects demonstrated overexpression of ISLR in breast lipotransfer white adipose tissue CD34+ cells and significantly lower expression in leukapheresis CD34+ cells.

Expression profiling by microarray of ISLR in human subjects demonstrated overexpression in non-union skeletal fractures compared to low expression in normal fractures.

Expression profiling by microarray of ISLR in obese female human subjects demonstrated consistent low expression of ISLR in subjects that followed a short-term low-fat hypocaloric diet.

== Regulation of Expression ==
=== Gene level regulation ===
There is one promoter region in the ISLR gene with a predicted length of 1,912 bp (Figure 5) extracted from Genomatix. Additionally, there is a polyadenylation signal at 3,142 bp in the ISLR nucleotide sequence (humans).

There are six distinct transcription factors that bind onto the promoter region of ISLR from Genomatix predictions: two SMAD factors, sine oculis homeobox (SIX), heat shock factor (HSF), PRDM, Snail, and cell cycles gene homology region (CHR).

Genomatix results predicted more transcription factor binding sites in ISLR with the highest matrix similarity (0.97~0.99) such as:

1. Myeloid zinc finger 1 factor (MZF1)
2. Nuclear factor of activated T-cells
3. Hepatocyte nuclear factor 3 (alpha, beta) (FOXA1, FOXA2)
4. E2F transcription factor 1
5. Eomesodermin, TBR-2 (T-box, brain, 2) (Brachyury gene, mesoderm developmental factor)
6. Homeodomain factor Nkx-2.5/Csx
7. Estrogen-related receptor alpha (secondary DNA binding preference)
8. Early B-cell factor 1 (Neuron specific olfactory factor)
9. Nascent polypeptide-associated complex subunit alpha 1
10. IKAROS family zinc finger 3 (Aiolos)
11. 3' half site of ZTRE motif (zinc transcriptional regulatory element)
12. AREB6 (Atp1a1 regulatory element binding factor 6)

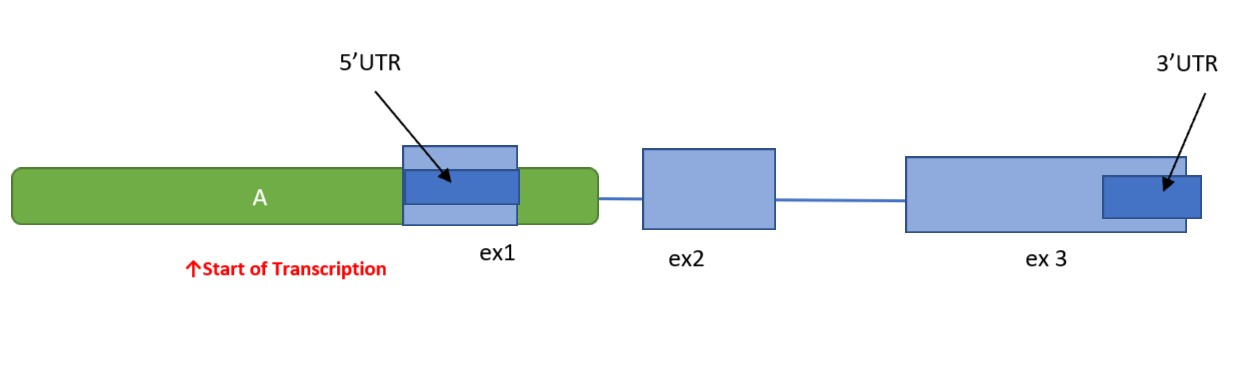
Figure 5. Promoter Diagram of ISLR. The general locations of the exon 1, 2, and 3, the most confident promoter region, and UTRs were extracted from Genomatix.

=== Transcript level regulation ===
The human gene of ISLR is predicted to be targeted by 85 miRNAs in miRDB. The top scoring (>88) miRNAs are has-miR-5197-3p, has-miR-4688, has-miR-3150a-3p, has-miR-16-5p, has-miR-195-5p, has-miR-15a-5p, and has-miR-6763-5p.

RBPmap, which maps predicted binding sites of RNA binding proteins, showed multiple conserved motifs in evolution relative to the human ISLR mRNA transcript variant 1 sequence such as:

1. BRUNOL6
2. CPEB2 and CPEB4
3. ESRP2
4. FMR1
5. FUS
6. FXR1 and FXR2
7. G3BP2
8. HNRNPA1, HNRNPA1L2, HNRNPA2B1, HNRNPC, HNRNPCL1, HNRNPF, HNRNPH1, HNRNPH2, HNRNPK, HNRNPL, HNRNPM, HNRNPU, HNRPLL.
9. HuR
10. IGF2BP2 and IGF2BP3
11. KHDRBS2
12. LIN28A

== Homology and Evolutionary History ==
=== Paralogs ===
Currently, there is one other paralog in humans known as ISLR 2 and two paralogous domains: LRRN4 (protein precursor 4) and LRRN4CL (protein precursor 4 C-terminal like).

=== Orthologs/Distant Homologs ===
As of August 2020, there above 190 known orthologs of the ISLR human gene, the most distant ortholog and homolog found in Exaiptasia pallida (sea anemone). The table below demonstrates the relationships between human ISLR protein characteristics and selected orthologs covering the range from closest related to Homo sapiens to most distant.

Orthologs of ISLR protein (human) Evolution Table
Species 1	Species 2	Common Name	Taxonomic Group	Accession number	Date of Divergence	Sequence Length	Protein Percent Identity	Protein Sequence Similarity
					(Million years ago [MYA])	(aa)		
Human vs.	Homo sapiens	Human	Primates	BAA85970.1	0	428	100%	100%
Human vs.	Macaca fascicularis	Crab-eating macaque	Primates	XP_005560108.1	29	428	98.33%	99.00%
Human vs.	Tursiops truncatus	Bottlenose dolphin	Cetacea	XP_033707870	96	428	91.58%	94.00%
Human vs.	Mus musculus	House mouse	Rodentia	BAA85973.1	160	428	88.24%	91.00%
Humans vs.	Myotis brandtii	Brandt's bat	Therapsid	XP_005882850.1	96	422	85.68%	89%
Human vs.	Monodelphis domestica	Gray short-tailed opossum	Didelphimorphia	XP_007478205	180	418	75.66%	83.00%
Human vs.	Ornithorhynchus anatinus	Platypus	Monotremata	XP_007663289.2	177	417	61.29%	72.00%
Human vs.	Lacerta agilis	Sand lizard	Squamata	XP_033016939.1	312	418	48.90%	58.00%
Human vs.	Apteryx rowi	Okarito kiwi	Apterygiformes	XP_025924151.1	318	429	48.03%	62.00%
Humans vs.	Haliaeetus leucocephalus	Bald eagle	Accipitriformes	XP_010569899	312	416	48.01%	61%
Human vs.	Exaiptasia pallida	Exaiptasia	Actiniaria	KXJ26782.1	824	304	29.89%	46.00%
Human vs.	Bactrocera dorsalis	Oriental fruit fly	Diptera	JAC38616.1	797	326	26.43%	48.00%
Human vs.	Fopius arisanus	Wasp (a parasitic type)	Hymenopterans	JAG75735.1	797	713	27.25%	42.00%

== Interacting protein ==
=== Protein interactions ===
There are a total of 284 results from PSIQUIC View of ISLR (human) that demonstrates its binding to numerous distinct proteins. iRefIndex showed 97 total results with multiple physical association interactions such as ISLR with Rho GTP-family (RHOBTB3), BMP7, Sphingose-1-Phosphate Lyase (SGPL1), Carnitine-acylcarnitine translocase (SLC25A20), Canopy FGF Signaling regulator 3 (CNPY3), and Leishmanolysin-like peptidase (LMLN). The physical associations were identified with two hybrid pooling approach, affinity chromatography technology, enzymatic study, or anti-tag coimmunoprecipitation. Overall, the results from iRefIndex suggests ISLR to be involved in various mechanisms such as cell migration, transport of different complexes, and metabolism (enzymatic mechanisms). For example, RHOBTB3 is involved in transporting different complexes along pathways such as endosomes to trans Golgi network and Golgi to ER. Furthermore, LMLN has been shown to play a role in cell migration, potentially mitotic progression. In terms of metabolism, SGPL1 is involved in the metabolism of sphingolipids.

=== Interactions with coronavirus strains ===
Based on the previous results from iRefindex that indicated physical associations between ISLR and other proteins, two different interactions were identified with distinct strains of coronavirus. An interaction with orf1ab polyprotein of the human coronavirus strain HKU1(HCov-HKU1) was shown in physical association with ISLR through the two hybrid pooling approach, where ISLR is indicated as "prey" and the orf1ab polyprotein is indicated as "bait".

There is another detected interaction of ISLR and Human SARS coronavirus through direct contact based on the two hybrid pooling approach.

== Clinical significance ==
=== Past studies ===
The delivery of ISLR-expressing lentivirus into a tumor stroma suppressed the growth of tumors in pancreatic ductal adenocarcinoma (PDAC). In PDAC, low expression of ISLR (Meflin) was associated with aggressive tumors, characterized by straight collagen fibers in the stroma. Regarding tumorigenesis in IBD patients, a study investigated the Hippo signaling pathway in intestinal regeneration of epithelial cells. ETS1, an oncogenic transcription factor in stromal cells, induced the expression of ISLR protein which inhibited Hippo signaling, thus promoting intestinal regeneration. In mice, it was demonstrated that deletion of ISLR in stromal cells can suppress tumorigenesis in the intestine. For the ISLR 2 paralog, a study demonstrated that congenital hydrocephalus, arthrogryposis, and abdominal distension is associated with an autosomal recessive knockout on the phenotype of ISLR 2 in a multiplex consanguineous family. ISLR 2 encodes a protein that plays a role in axon guidance in brain development, hence, unveiling potential links to certain congenital neurological disorders.
