= CIROP =

Identifiers
- Aliases: CIROP, leishmanolysin homolog, ciliated left-right organizer metallopeptidase, LMLN2, leishmanolysin like peptidase 2
- External IDs: GeneCards: CIROP
Orthologs
Databases	NCBI: entry
Species	Human	Mouse
Entrez	100128908	n/a
Ensembl	n/a	n/a
UniProt	n a	n/a
RefSeq (mRNA)	n/a	n/a
RefSeq (protein)	n/a	n/a
Location (UCSC)	n/a	n/a
PubMed search		n/a
- Wikidata
View/Edit Human

Ciliated left-right organizer metallopeptidase (CIROP) is a protein that in humans is encoded by the CIROP gene.

== Gene ==
The CIROP gene is found on the negative strand of the long arm of human chromosome 14 at position 11.2. Its gene neighbors on the negative strand are CEBPE(CCAAT Enhancer Binding Protein Epsilon), and ACIN1 (Apoptotic Chromatin Condensation Inducer) 1. CIROP is 5,928 bp long.

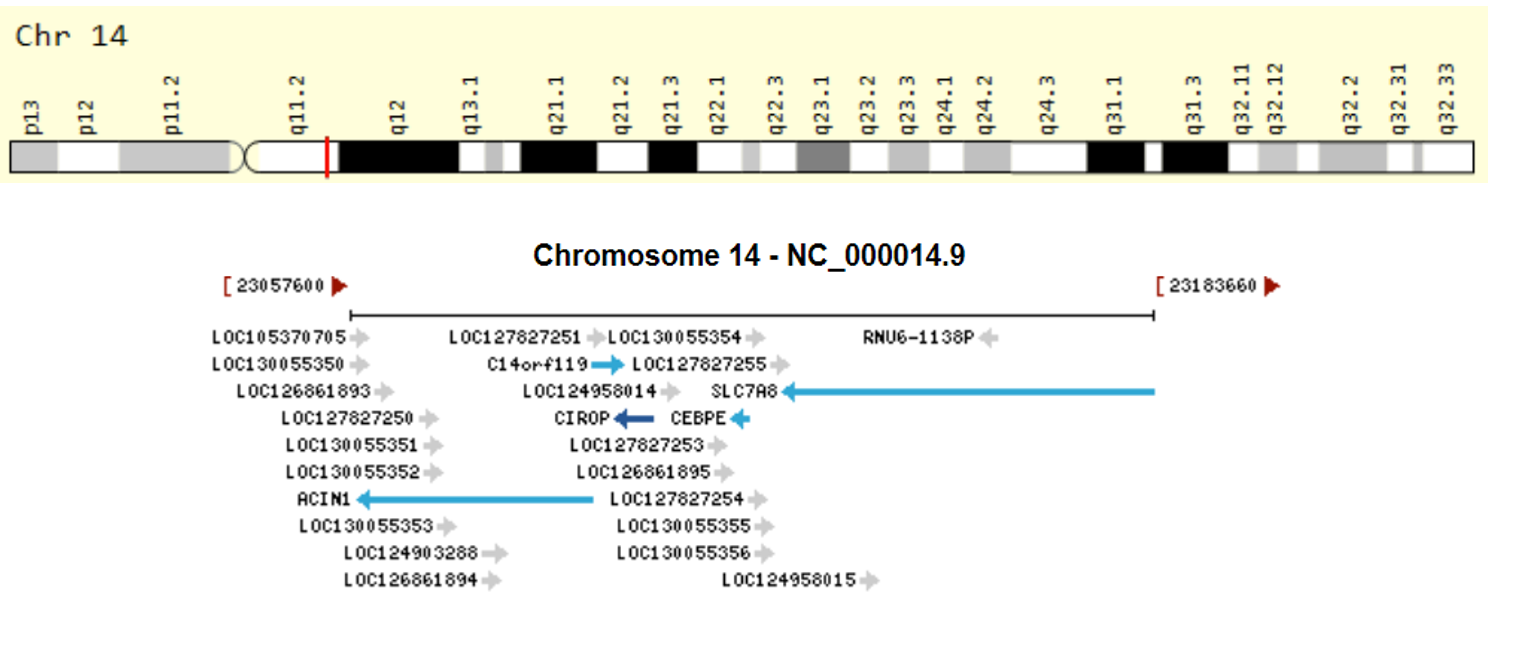
Location of CIROP on chromosome 14 and its gene neighbors

=== Expression ===
CIROP has no tissue specificity with ubiquitous low expression. CIROP is most expressed in the testis, thyroid, and lungs. It also goes by the alias LMLN2. CIROP is expressed during the development of the left right organizer in early embryogenesis.

== Transcript ==
The mRNA transcript for CIROP is 2656 base pairs long and includes 16 exons. There is a second isoform that excludes exons 5-6 which can be seen underlined in the conceptual translation in figure 2.

The conceptual translation for the CIROP gene

== Protein ==
The most complete sequence produces a protein that is 788 amino acids long. The protein features a zinc binding domain motif, and 5 N-linked glycosylation sites. Additionally computational analysis predicted six Myristoylation sites, three sumoylation sites, and one Propionylation site. The CIROP protein is found on the cell membrane with a type 1A transmembrane morphology which can be seen in figure 4 with the N-terminus being extracellular and the c-terminus being cytosolic.

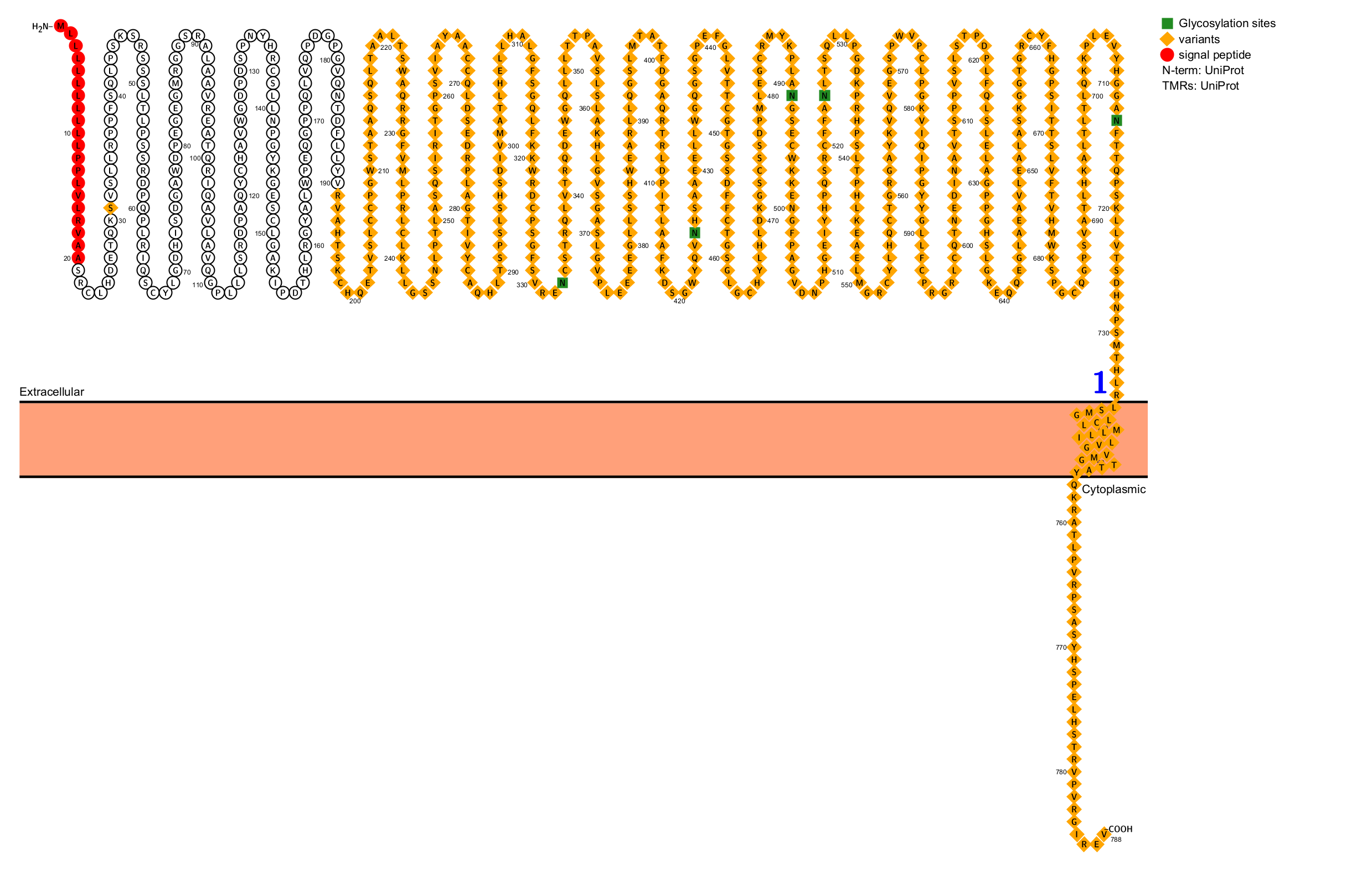
Protter visualization of CIROP gene with predicted transmembrane morphology

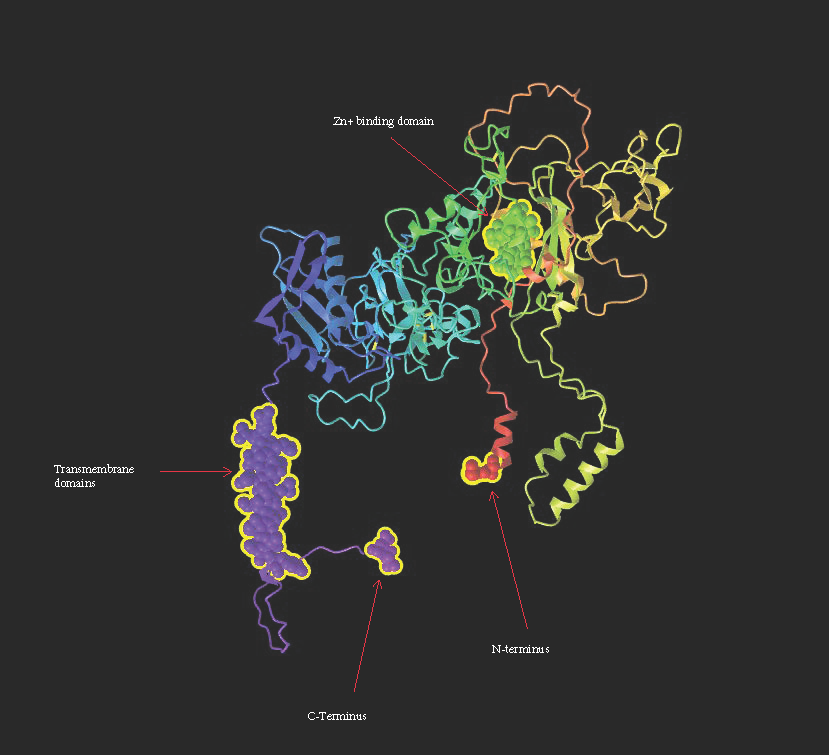
Annotated CIROP predicted protein with N-terminus, C-terminus, Zinc binding domain, and transmembrane domain highlighted

== Protein Interactions ==
CIROp interacts with three cell surface proteins, Ring Finger Protein 225 (RNF225), Marker Of Proliferation Ki-67(MKI67), and Anthrax Toxin Receptor Like(ANTXRL). RNF225 is predicted to be an important component of the cell membrane and play a role in enabling metal ion binding. MKI67 is involved in mitotic chromosome regulation and c-terminus binding capability. ANTXRL is predicted to be a component of the cell membrane, play a role in toxin transport, and enable the activity of transmembrane signaling receptors.

== Evolutionary History ==
CIROP first appeared in cartilaginous jawless fish approximately 563 million years ago. CIROP is in the peptidase M8 family which has 14 other constituents.

=== Evolution rate ===
CIROP is evolving quickly at a comparable rate to the fibrinogen alpha chain, as shown in figure 5.

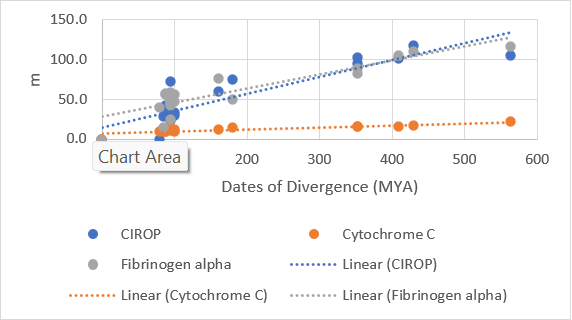
Evolution rate of Gene CIROP in comparison To Cytochrome C and Fibrinogen alpha

=== Orthologs ===
CIROP has orthologs in most mammals, amphibians, lungfish, and lampreys. It is not found in pigs, birds, and most whales.

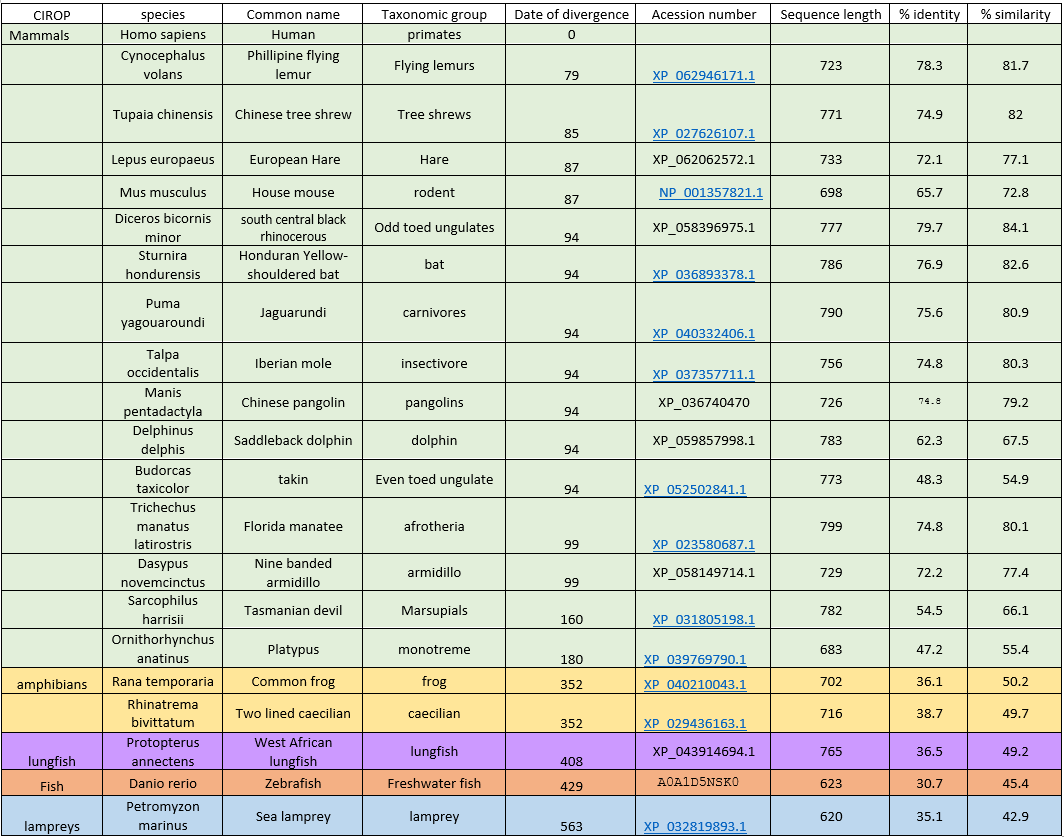
twenty orthologs for the CIROP gene

=== Paralogs ===
CIROP has one paralog in humans leishmanolysin like peptidase(LMLN) which is also a member of the M8 peptidase family. LMLN is found in all the CIROP orthologs listed in table 1 with the exception being the tasmanian devil(Sarcophilus harrisii). LMLN is found in birds and as far back as cartilaginous fish. It also has a paralog called invadolysin found only in arthropods.

== Clinical Significance ==
There are six mutations to CIROP that can be pathogenic causing developmental issues consistent with the disorder Situs ambiguus. Knocking out CIROP in zebrafish and Xenopus models also produced similar conditions consistent with Situs Ambiguus. There is a mutation that can occur in the 3' UTR that disrupts the binding site for the microRNA MiR-7-1 which increased the susceptibility of ischemic strokes in Han Chinese populations.

== Function ==
CIROP's expression during left-right organizer development and its proclivity to cause situs ambiguus when mutated or knocked out suggests it's an essential protein for left-right organizer function. This and CIROPs morphology on the cell surface points to CIROP playing a key role in regulating the left-right organizer through its cell surface.
