= FAM199X =

Identifiers
- Aliases: FAM199X, CXorf39, family with sequence similarity 199, X-linked
- External IDs: MGI: 2384304; GeneCards: FAM199X

Gene location (Human)
Chr.	X chromosome (human)
Band	Xq22.2	Start	104,166,453 bp
Band	Xq22.2	End	104,195,902 bp

Gene location (Mouse)
Chr.	X chromosome (mouse)
Band	X|X F1	Start	135,950,343 bp
Band	X|X F1	End	135,983,252 bp
RNA expression pattern
Bgee	Human / Mouse (ortholog); Top expressed in: corpus epididymis; lateral nuclear group of thalamus; pars compacta; oocyte; pars reticulata; secondary oocyte; pancreatic epithelial cell; external globus pallidus; Brodmann area 23; superior vestibular nucleus / Top expressed in: hand; superior cervical ganglion; retinal pigment epithelium; otolith organ; oocyte; secondary oocyte; Bowman's capsule; utricle; primary oocyte; zygote; More reference expression data
BioGPS	n/a
Orthologs
Databases	NCBI: entry; OMA: entry
Species	Human	Mouse
Entrez	139231	245622
Ensembl	ENSG00000123575	ENSMUSG00000042595
UniProt	Q6PEV8	Q8K2D0
RefSeq (mRNA)	NM_207318	NM_146261
RefSeq (protein)	NP_997201	NP_666373
Location (UCSC)	Chr X: 104.17 – 104.2 Mb	Chr X: 135.95 – 135.98 Mb
PubMed search
- Wikidata
View/Edit Human	View/Edit Mouse

Family with sequence similarity 199, X-linked (FAM199X) is a protein which in humans is encoded by the FAM199X gene. This gene has orthologs in most vertebrates, including most mammals, birds, amphibians, and fish with some homologs within invertebrates. Within humans, this gene is commonly expressed in the brain and thyroid. The gene has been linked to some genetic disorders, such as Pelizaeus–Merzbacher disease, and some cancers, such as Stomach cancer, but FAM199X's role in those diseases is not yet well understood within the scientific community.

== Gene ==
FAM199X is located on the long arm of the X chromosome at Xq22.2 on the plus strand, approximately 30,000 bases, and encodes six exons. The gene is located next to an enhancer called LOC130068517, also known as ATAC-STARR-Seq Lymphoblastoid Active Region 29826.

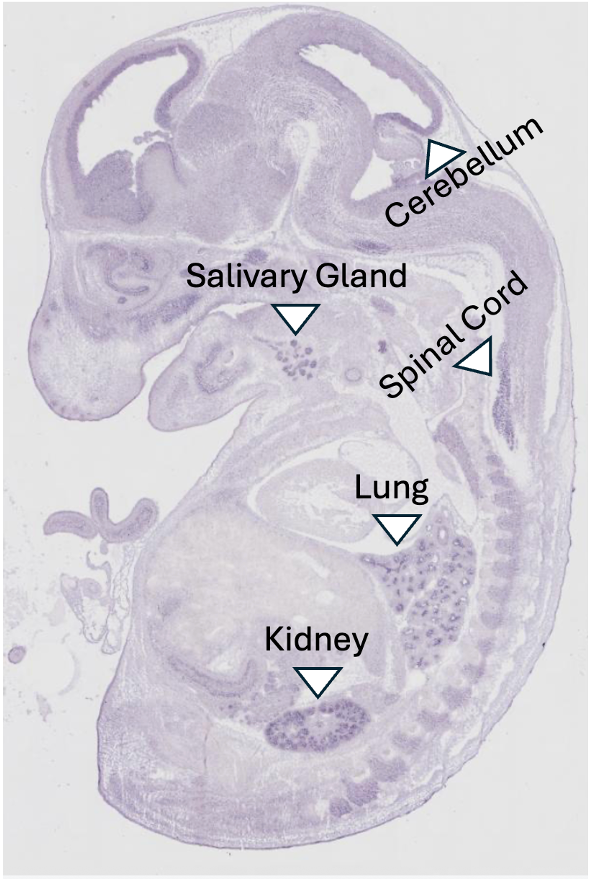
Mouse expression of FAM199X within tissues at E14.5

=== Expression ===
Expression is ubiquitous and high across may tissues at consistent values of expression. The gene has the highest expression within the cerebellum of the brain, followed by tissues related to hormone secretion, the thyroid, prostate, and kidney. These results were checked against distant orthologs of FAM199X, which had similar expression profiles. There was especially high expression in the cerebellum, thalamus, and epididymis with below expected expression in adipose, bladder, heart, liver, fetal lung, skin, ileum, and stomach tissue. Within the cell, FAM199X has expression with in the nucleus and endoplasmic reticulum. Within the promoter sequence, there was 6 eQTLs that were expressed and half of them were related to the thyroid of respiratory system.

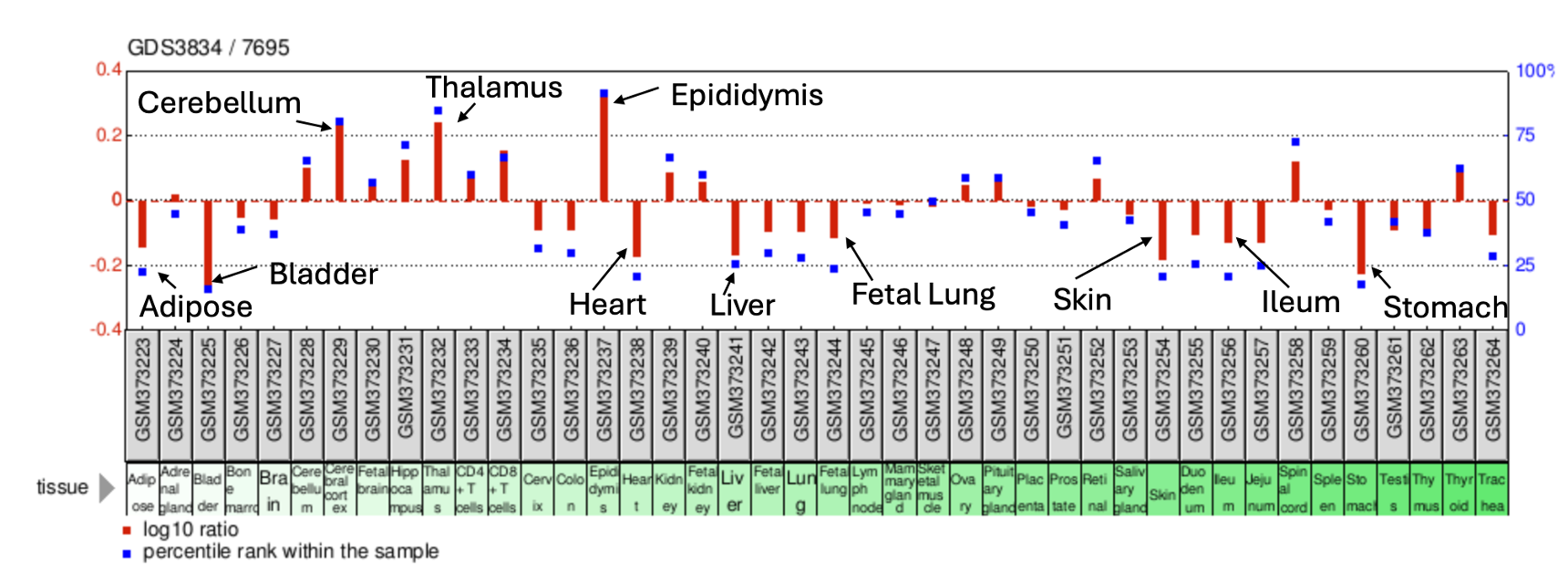
FAM199X Expression Profile

=== Protein localization ===
FAM199X is localized within the nucleus and cytoplasm.

== mRNA ==
Four transcript variants of FAM199X produce two protein isoforms. The four transcript variants are FAM199X-X1 variant 1 with 7498 nucleotides, FAM199X-X1 variant 2 with 7495 nucleotides, FAM199X-X2 variant 3 with 7179 nucleotides, and FAM199X-X1 variant 4 with 7171 nucleotides. There are six exons in FAM199X-X1 variants and five exons in FAM199X-X2 variants.

FAM199X has two isoforms, each with 6 exons and two variants of each isoform. Isoform X1 encodes for 345 amino acids while Isoform X2 encodes a 205 amino acid protein.

The 3' Untranslated Region of FAM199X is abnormally large, spanning 6124 nucleotides.

Isoform Table
Transcript Variant	Accession # mRNA	Length (nt)	Exons	Protein isoform	Accession # Protein	Length (aa)	Isoelectric Point (pI)
Variant 1	XM_005262079.4	7495	6	Isoform X1	XP_005262136.1	345	4.84
Variant 2	XM_054326467.1	7498	6	Isoform X1	XP_054182442.1	345	4.84
Variant 3	XM_047441826.1	7179	6	Isoform X2	XP_047297782.1	205	9.07
Variant 4	XM_054326468.1	7171	6	Isoform X2	XP_054182443.1	205	9.07

== Evolutionary history ==
=== Homologs ===
FAM199X had several highly conserved orthologs amongst mammals, birds, reptiles, amphibians, fish, and less conserved orthologs in chorodates and arachnids. The most distant ortholog detected is the Common Household Spider, Parasteatoda tepidaiorum.

=== Paralogs ===
FAM199X has no paralogs.

=== Evolution ===
FAM199X evolved around 708 million years ago, with the oldest known ortholog, Parasteatoda tepidaiorum, diverging from human evolution about 708 million years ago. The evolution of FAM199X was slow, with a protein divergence close to cytochrome c, a highly conserved protein.

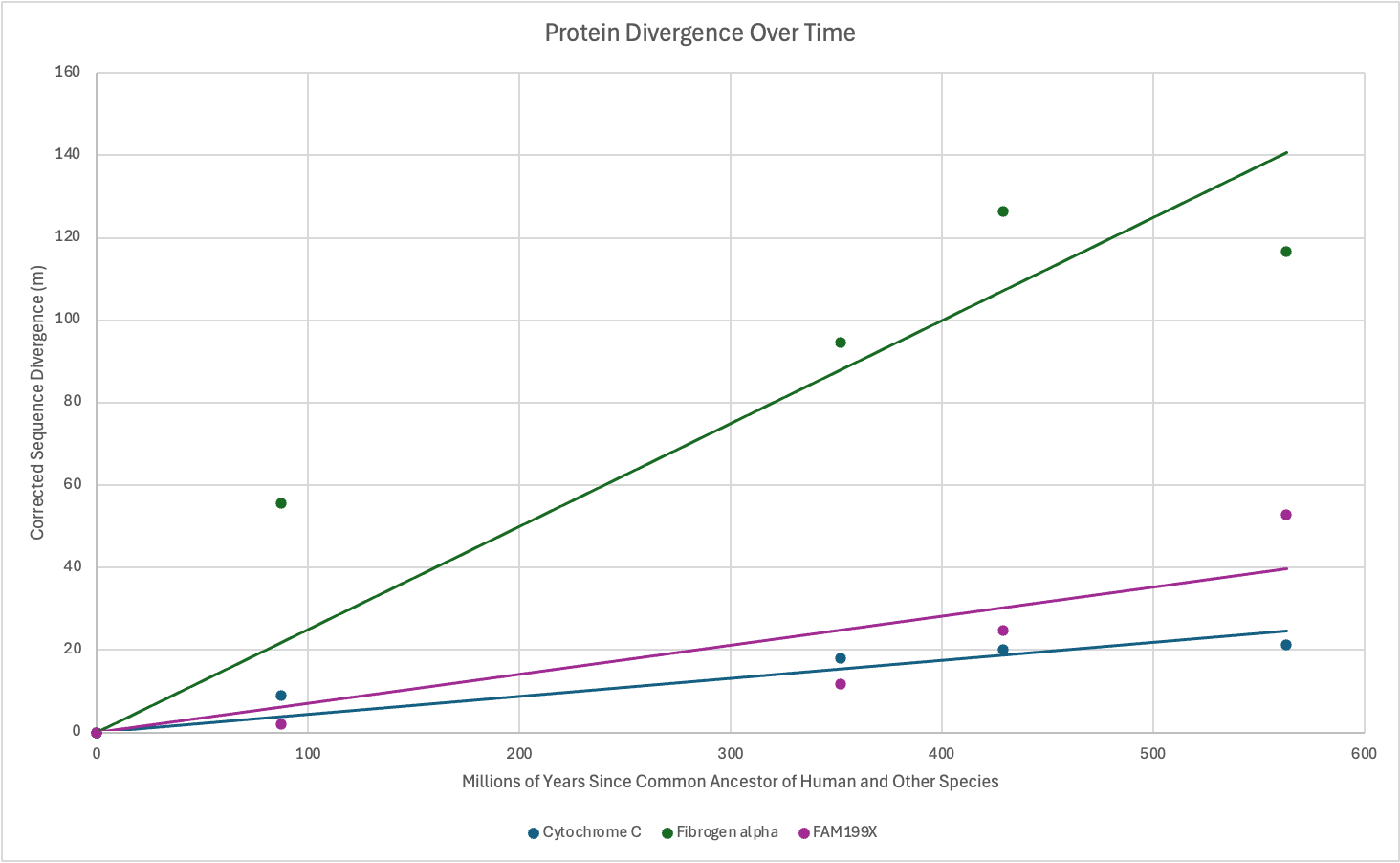
Comparing FAM199X to a fast-evolving protein, Fibrinogen alpha, and a slow-evolving protein, Cytochrome C.

Orthologs
Genus and Species	Common name	Taxonomy	Date of divergence (MYA)	Accession #	Sequence length (aa)	Identity (%)	Similarity (%)
Homo sapiens	Human	Primates: Great Apes	0	NM_207318.4	388	100	100
Macaca mulatta	Indochinese rhesus macaque	Primates: New World Monkey	28.8	NP_001180862.1	388	100	100
Plecturocebus cupreus	Coppery titi monkey	Primates: Old World Monkey	43	KAL0588686.1	423	99	100
Mus musculus	House mouse	Mammals: Rodent	87	NP_666373.1	388	98	97
Pteropus vampyrus	Large flying fox	Mammals: Chiropetra/Megabat	94	XP_011379288.1	388	99	99
Ornithorhynchus anatinus	Platypus	Mammals: Monotremes	180	XP_028923647.1	390	93	95
Chelydra serpentina	Common snapping turtle	Reptiles: Testudines/Turtles	319	KAG6937128.1	381	90	92
Eublepharis macularius	Leopard gecko	Birds: Aves/Galliformes	319	XP_054853091.1	384	87	89
Gallus gallus	Red junglefowl	Reptiles: Squamata	319	XP_003641135.2	381	90	92
Ranitomeya variabilis	Zimmerman's poison frog	Amphibian: Anura	352	XP_077141317.1	375	89	92
Erpetoichthys calabaricus	Reedfish	Fish: Ray-finned	429	XP_028671530.1	377	85	89
Collichthys lucidus	Spinyhead Croaker	Fish: Ray-finned	429	TKS72713.1	396	78	83
Leucoraja erinaceus	Little skate	Fish: Cartilagenous	462	XP_055499985.1	378	81	86
Pristis pectinata	Smalltooth sawfish	Fish: Cartilagenous	462	XP_051876775.1	378	81	86
Lethenteron reissneri	Asiatic Brook Lamprey	Jawless Vertebrate: Petromyzontida	563	XP_061419915.1	441	59	69
Branchiostoma lanceolatum	Common lancelet	Invertebrate: Cephalochordata	581	CAH1254916.1	356	33	51
Nematostella vectensis	Starlet Sea Anemone	Invertebrate: Cnidaria	685	XP_001632934.1	344	31	44
Ixodes scapularis	Deerk tick	Invertebrate: Arachida	686		353	31	49
Magallana gigas	Pacific Oyster	Invertebrate: Mollusk	708	XP_011447698.3	317	30	47
Parasteatoda tepidariorum	Common house spider	Invertebrate: Arachida	708	XP_042905439.1	273	28	44

== Protein ==
The protein contains 388 amino acids. FAM199X has a molecular weight about 43 kDa with an isoelectric point of 4.95. There are two protein isoforms of FAM199X, FAM199X-X1 and FAM199X-X2. FAM199X-X1 is 345 amino acids long and has a weight of 38.61kDa, and FAM199X-X2 is 205 amino acids long and 22.8kDa. FAM199X has a protein motif for cytomegalovirus protein US29. Found within FAM199X are cleaevage sites for N-Arginine dibasic convertase, MAPK, and BRCA1. N-Arginine dibasic convertase is an enzyme located in the brain that converts proto-hormones to hormones, but has not been extensively studied. MAPK and BRCA1 have been implicated in cancer, acting as a tumor suppressor that can increase the risk of some cancers. FAM199X also has a high amount of serine, with a two standard deviation increase in serine compared to other human proteins.

=== Post translational modifications ===
FAM199X has several regions of interest including a disordered region, a NET domain, N-linked glycosylation, N-myristoylation, C-mannosylation, and two proven phosphorylation sites. The NET domain stands for N-terminal extra-terminal domain. It is thought that this domain is related to bromodomain proteins, and this domain is used for protein binding. N-linked glycosylation is an oligosaccharide bound generally to membrane-associated or secreted proteins, which further shows that FAM199X is secreted. N-myristolation is the attachment of a fatty acid to the protein, which could allow for a site to associate with the plasma membrane. C-mannosylation has many roles, including intercellular transport and structural stability.

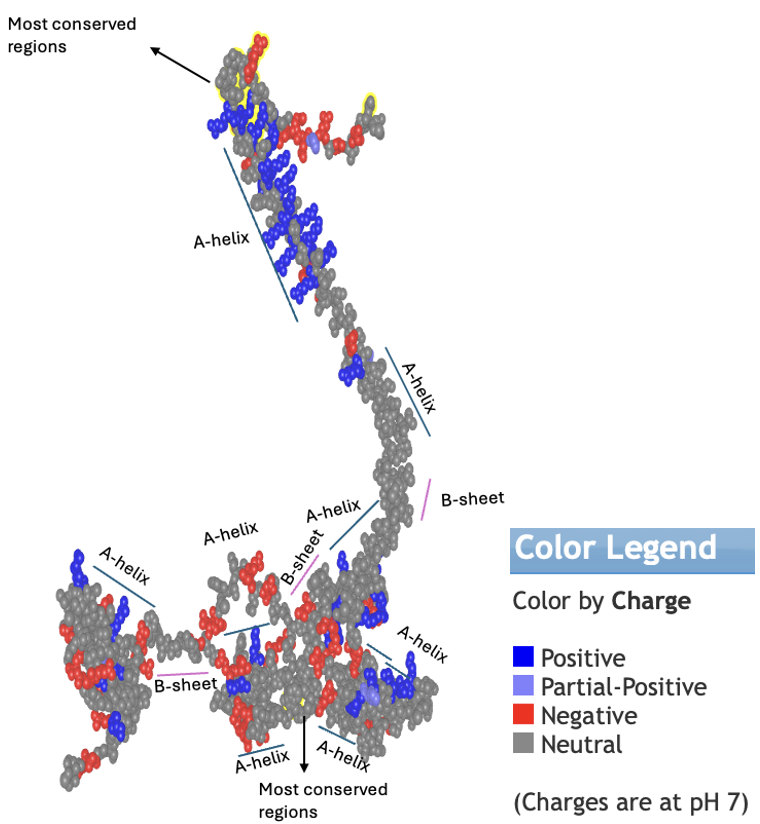
FAM199X protein tertiary structure with labeled regions and secondary structure. The coloration depicts charged sections with blue signifying basic amino acids, red signifying acidic amino acids, and purple signifying partially positive amino acids, and grey signifying neutral amino acids.

=== Tertiary structure ===
The tertiary structure of FAM199X shows a globular area with alpha helices and beta strands within the first 300 amino acids, but the last 88 amino acids are depicted with a large arm and a possible protein binding domain, which is encoded by a alpha helix within the most conserved region of the FAM199X protein.

=== Protein interaction ===
FAM199X associates with three proteins of note, WRD5, P, and M. Proteins P and M are viral proteins while protein WRD5 is a high scoring protein related to the kidney and brain. Protein P and M are relate to the flu and SARS-COV-2. There is also evidence of FAM199X association with Nipah virus.

=== Variants ===
There were no variants found to be pathogenic and the majority of the variants were uncategorized and were found at very low frequency.

== Clinical significance ==
It is suggested that FAM199X could be involved in various clinical diseases and viruses, including the flu, SARS-COV-2, the Nipah virus, and cancer. It was speculated that FAM199X had effects on Pelizaeus–Merzbacher disease, but those results were never found. It is suggested that FAM199X could be secreted via the normal pathway involved with the endocrine system and the uncinventional secretion method.
