= WFIKKN2 =

Protein-coding gene in the species Homo sapiens

Identifiers
- Aliases: WFIKKN2, GASP-1, WFDC20B, WFIKKNRP, hGASP-1, WAP, follistatin/kazal, immunoglobulin, kunitz and netrin domain containing 2
- External IDs: OMIM: 610895; MGI: 2669209; GeneCards: WFIKKN2

Gene location (Human)
Chr.	Chromosome 17 (human)
Band	17q21.33	Start	50,834,650 bp
Band	17q21.33	End	50,842,353 bp

Gene location (Mouse)
Chr.	Chromosome 11 (mouse)
Band	11|11 D	Start	94,126,782 bp
Band	11|11 D	End	94,136,831 bp
RNA expression pattern
Bgee	Human / Mouse (ortholog); Top expressed in: left ovary; right ovary; testicle; retinal pigment epithelium; muscle of thigh; ventricular zone; right adrenal cortex; left adrenal gland; cerebellar hemisphere; left adrenal cortex / Top expressed in: otolith organ; utricle; choroid plexus of lateral ventricle; muscle of thigh; choroid plexus of fourth ventricle; retinal pigment epithelium; Epithelium of choroid plexus; thymus; medial head of gastrocnemius muscle; temporal muscle; More reference expression data
BioGPS	n/a
Gene ontology
Molecular function	peptidase inhibitor activity; enzyme inhibitor activity; metalloendopeptidase inhibitor activity; serine-type endopeptidase inhibitor activity; protein binding; receptor antagonist activity; transforming growth factor beta binding
Cellular component	extracellular region; extracellular space
Biological process	skeletal system development; negative regulation of DNA binding; roof of mouth development; negative regulation of peptidase activity; negative regulation of protein binding; negative regulation of endopeptidase activity; transforming growth factor beta receptor signaling pathway; negative regulation of transforming growth factor beta receptor signaling pathway; extracellular negative regulation of signal transduction; negative regulation of signaling receptor activity
Sources:Amigo / QuickGO
Orthologs
Databases	NCBI: entry; OMA: entry
Species	Human	Mouse
Entrez	124857	278507
Ensembl	ENSG00000173714	ENSMUSG00000044177
UniProt	Q8TEU8	Q7TQN3
RefSeq (mRNA)	NM_175575; NM_001330341	NM_181819
RefSeq (protein)	NP_001317270; NP_783165	NP_861540
Location (UCSC)	Chr 17: 50.83 – 50.84 Mb	Chr 11: 94.13 – 94.14 Mb
PubMed search
- Wikidata
View/Edit Human	View/Edit Mouse

WAP, follistatin/kazal, immunoglobulin, kunitz and netrin domain containing 2 is a protein that in humans is encoded by the WFIKKN2 gene.

== Function ==
The WFIKKN1 protein contains a WAP domain, follistatin domain, immunoglobulin domain, two tandem Kunitz domains, and an NTR domain. This gene encodes a WFIKKN1-related protein which has the same domain organization as the WFIKKN1 protein. The WAP-type, follistatin type, Kunitz-type, and NTR-type protease inhibitory domains may control the action of multiple types of proteases. [provided by RefSeq, Jul 2008]. ##Evidence-Data-START## Transcript exon combination :: AY358142.1, AK127743.1 [ECO:0000332] RNAseq introns :: single sample supports all introns ERS025083, ERS025084 [ECO:0000348] ##Evidence-Data-END##

== See also ==
- Kazal-type serine protease inhibitor domain
