= Neurotrimin =

Protein-coding gene in the species Homo sapiens

NTM

Identifiers
- Aliases: NTM, HNT, IGLON2, NTRI, neurotrimin, CEPU-1
- External IDs: OMIM: 607938; MGI: 2446259; GeneCards: NTM

Gene location (Human)
Chr.	Chromosome 11 (human)
Band	11q25	Start	131,370,478 bp
Band	11q25	End	132,336,822 bp

Gene location (Mouse)
Chr.	Chromosome 9 (mouse)
Band	9|9 A4	Start	28,906,046 bp
Band	9|9 A4	End	29,874,437 bp
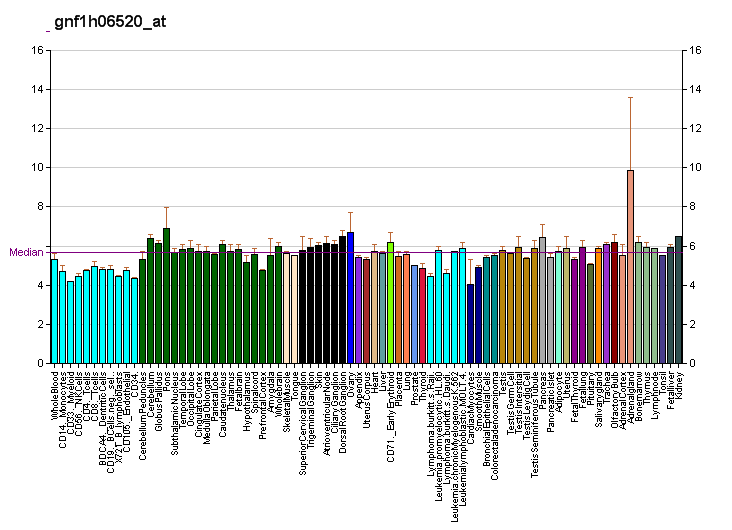
RNA expression pattern
Bgee	Human / Mouse (ortholog); Top expressed in: right hemisphere of cerebellum; cerebellar vermis; primary visual cortex; middle temporal gyrus; postcentral gyrus; Brodmann area 23; superior frontal gyrus; corpus callosum; right frontal lobe; Brodmann area 9 / Top expressed in: primary motor cortex; visual cortex; cerebellar cortex; primary visual cortex; cerebellar vermis; lobe of cerebellum; superior frontal gyrus; prefrontal cortex; mammillary body; lateral geniculate nucleus; More reference expression data
BioGPS	More reference expression data
Gene ontology
Molecular function	protein binding
Cellular component	anchored component of membrane; membrane; extracellular region; plasma membrane
Biological process	neuron recognition; cell adhesion
Sources:Amigo / QuickGO
Orthologs
Databases	NCBI: entry; OMA: entry
Species	Human	Mouse
Entrez	50863	235106
Ensembl	ENSG00000182667	ENSMUSG00000059974
UniProt	Q9P121	Q99PJ0
RefSeq (mRNA)	NM_001048209; NM_001144058; NM_001144059; NM_016522; NM_001352001 NM_001352002; NM_001352003; NM_001352004; NM_001352005; NM_001352006; NM_001352007; NM_001352008; NM_001352009	NM_172290; NM_001357593; NM_001357597; NM_001357598; NM_001357601 NM_001357602; NM_001357603
RefSeq (protein)	NP_001041674; NP_001137530; NP_001137531; NP_057606; NP_001338930 NP_001338931; NP_001338932; NP_001338933; NP_001338934; NP_001338935; NP_001338936; NP_001338937; NP_001338938	NP_758494; NP_001344522; NP_001344526; NP_001344527; NP_001344530 NP_001344531; NP_001344532
Location (UCSC)	Chr 11: 131.37 – 132.34 Mb	Chr 9: 28.91 – 29.87 Mb
PubMed search
- Wikidata
View/Edit Human	View/Edit Mouse

Neurotrimin is a protein that in humans is encoded by the NTM gene.

This gene encodes a member of the IgLON (LAMP, OBCAM, Ntm) family of immunoglobulin (Ig) domain-containing glycosylphosphatidylinositol (GPI)-anchored cell adhesion molecules. The encoded protein may promote neurite outgrowth and adhesion via a homophilic mechanism. This gene is closely linked to a related family member, opioid binding protein/cell adhesion molecule-like (OPCML) on chromosome 11. Multiple alternatively spliced variants have been found but only two variants have had their full-length sequences determined.
