= Compton–North congenital myopathy =

- Other names: Myopathy, congenital, Compton–North, MYPCN (abbr.)
- Specialty: Medical genetics
- Frequency: 0.0001%

Compton–North congenital myopathy, also known as congenital lethal myopathy, Compton–North type, is a rare, fatal genetic disorder of pre-natal onset that results in death shortly after birth and is characterized by fetal akinesia and movement restriction, polyhydramnios, severe hypotonia of neonatal-onset, generalized weakness of the respiratory, bulbar, and skeletal muscles, presence of multiple congenital muscular contractures.

Additional features include premature birth, low birth weight, failure to thrive, abnormal reflexes, scaphocephaly, hypertelorbitism, oval-shaped face, small hands, single transverse palmar crease, high-arched palate, arachnodactyly, and camptodactyly (causing overlapping fingers). Ultrastructural findings include sarcomeric disruptions, Z-band disorganization, and an absence of integrin alpha7, beta2-syntrophin, alpha-dystrobrevin. Only four infants from a heavily consanguineous Egyptian Australian family have been described in the medical literature, and it is caused by homozygous mutations in the CNTN1 gene, located in chromosome 12.

The condition was not named after the doctors who first discovered the condition, but rather the doctors who first described it in detail: Dr. Alison G. Compton and Dr. Kathryn N. North.
