= Limbic system-associated membrane protein =

Protein found in neurons

LSAMP

Identifiers
- Aliases: LSAMP, IGLON3, LAMP, limbic system-associated membrane protein, limbic system associated membrane protein
- External IDs: OMIM: 603241; MGI: 1261760; GeneCards: LSAMP

Gene location (Human)
Chr.	Chromosome 3 (human)
Band	3q13.31	Start	115,802,363 bp
Band	3q13.31	End	117,139,389 bp

Gene location (Mouse)
Chr.	Chromosome 16 (mouse)
Band	16|16 B4	Start	39,984,361 bp
Band	16|16 B4	End	42,181,679 bp
RNA expression pattern
Bgee	Human / Mouse (ortholog); Top expressed in: postcentral gyrus; entorhinal cortex; Brodmann area 23; lateral nuclear group of thalamus; superior frontal gyrus; ventral tegmental area; pons; pars compacta; superior vestibular nucleus; primary visual cortex / Top expressed in: dentate gyrus of hippocampal formation granule cell; central gray substance of midbrain; nucleus of stria terminalis; facial motor nucleus; cerebellar cortex; hippocampus proper; superior frontal gyrus; primary visual cortex; anterior horn of spinal cord; amygdala; More reference expression data
BioGPS	n/a
Gene ontology
Molecular function	protein binding
Cellular component	anchored component of membrane; membrane; extracellular region; plasma membrane; cytosol; integral component of membrane
Biological process	cell adhesion; nervous system development; locomotory exploration behavior
Sources:Amigo / QuickGO
Orthologs
Databases	NCBI: entry; OMA: entry
Species	Human	Mouse
Entrez	4045	268890
Ensembl	ENSG00000185565	ENSMUSG00000061080
UniProt	Q13449	Q8BLK3
RefSeq (mRNA)	NM_002338; NM_001318915	NM_175548; NM_001347236
RefSeq (protein)	NP_001305844; NP_002329	NP_001334165; NP_001348210; NP_001348211
Location (UCSC)	Chr 3: 115.8 – 117.14 Mb	Chr 16: 39.98 – 42.18 Mb
PubMed search
- Wikidata
View/Edit Human	View/Edit Mouse

Limbic system-associated membrane protein (shortened to LSAMP or LAMP) is a protein which in humans is encoded by the gene LSAMP.

== Structure ==
LSAMP is a 64- to 68-kDa heavily glycosylated protein.

== Tissue distribution ==
LSAMP is found in neurons, specifically it is distributed in cortical and subcortical regions of the limbic system.

== Subcellular distribution ==
LSAMP protein is expressed on the surface of somata and proximal dendrites of neurons where it integrates via glycosyl-phosphatidyl-inositol (GPI) anchor. Despite the name, LSAMP is not expressed only in the limbic-associated areas, but also less intensely in the midbrain and hindbrain regions.
