= NPTN =

Protein-coding gene in the species Homo sapiens

Identifiers
- Aliases: NPTN, GP55, GP65, SDFR1, SDR1, np55, np65, neuroplastin
- External IDs: OMIM: 612820; MGI: 108077; GeneCards: NPTN

Gene location (Human)
Chr.	Chromosome 15 (human)
Band	15q24.1	Start	73,560,014 bp
Band	15q24.1	End	73,634,134 bp

Gene location (Mouse)
Chr.	Chromosome 9 (mouse)
Band	9|9 B	Start	58,582,240 bp
Band	9|9 B	End	58,657,955 bp
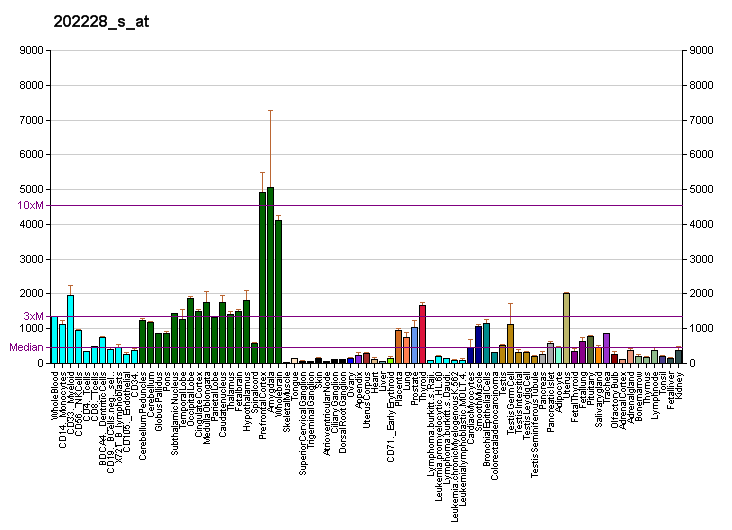
RNA expression pattern
Bgee	Human / Mouse (ortholog); Top expressed in: Brodmann area 23; lateral nuclear group of thalamus; cerebellar vermis; germinal epithelium; jejunal mucosa; tail of epididymis; bronchial epithelial cell; visceral pleura; orbitofrontal cortex; caput epididymis / Top expressed in: nucleus accumbens; superior frontal gyrus; cerebellar cortex; olfactory tubercle; lobe of cerebellum; primary visual cortex; cerebellar vermis; cingulate gyrus; lateral geniculate nucleus; prefrontal cortex; More reference expression data
BioGPS	More reference expression data
Gene ontology
Molecular function	transmembrane transporter binding; fibroblast growth factor receptor binding; cell adhesion molecule binding; type 1 fibroblast growth factor receptor binding; cell-cell adhesion mediator activity; protein binding
Cellular component	integral component of membrane; synaptic membrane; membrane; postsynaptic density; plasma membrane; inhibitory synapse; dendrite; presynaptic membrane; cell surface; axon; Schaffer collateral - CA1 synapse; glutamatergic synapse; GABA-ergic synapse; integral component of presynaptic active zone membrane; integral component of postsynaptic density membrane; immunological synapse
Biological process	visual learning; positive regulation of long-term synaptic potentiation; nervous system development; cell adhesion; positive regulation of protein localization; positive regulation of ERK1 and ERK2 cascade; positive regulation of long-term neuronal synaptic plasticity; positive regulation of neuron projection development; positive regulation of cytosolic calcium ion concentration; homophilic cell adhesion via plasma membrane adhesion molecules; modulation of chemical synaptic transmission; synapse organization; regulation of receptor localization to synapse; excitatory synapse assembly; positive regulation of protein phosphorylation; positive regulation of fibroblast growth factor receptor signaling pathway; long-term potentiation; axon guidance; dendrite self-avoidance; trans-synaptic signaling by trans-synaptic complex, modulating synaptic transmission; negative regulation of cytokine production; cellular calcium ion homeostasis
Sources:Amigo / QuickGO
Orthologs
Databases	NCBI: entry; OMA: entry
Species	Human	Mouse
Entrez	27020	20320
Ensembl	ENSG00000156642	ENSMUSG00000032336
UniProt	Q9Y639	P97300
RefSeq (mRNA)	NM_001161363; NM_001161364; NM_012428; NM_017455	NM_001293673; NM_009145; NM_001357751
RefSeq (protein)	NP_001154835; NP_001154836; NP_036560; NP_059429	NP_001280602; NP_033171; NP_001344680; NP_001392991
Location (UCSC)	Chr 15: 73.56 – 73.63 Mb	Chr 9: 58.58 – 58.66 Mb
PubMed search
- Wikidata
View/Edit Human	View/Edit Mouse

Neuroplastin is a protein that in humans is encoded by the NPTN gene.

Neuroplastin is a type I transmembrane protein belonging to the Ig superfamily. The protein is believed to be involved in cell-cell interactions or cell-substrate interactions. The alpha and beta transcripts show differential localization within the brain.

In 2014, in a study led by Dr. Sylvane Desrivières, of King's College London's Institute of Psychiatry found that "teenagers who had a highly functioning NPTN gene performed better in intelligence tests"
