= LRRC24 =

Protein-coding gene in the species Homo sapiens

Identifiers
- Aliases: LRRC24, LRRC14OS, leucine rich repeat containing 24
- External IDs: MGI: 3605040; GeneCards: LRRC24

Gene location (Human)
Chr.	Chromosome 8 (human)
Band	8q24.3	Start	144,522,388 bp
Band	8q24.3	End	144,527,033 bp

Gene location (Mouse)
Chr.	Chromosome 15 (mouse)
Band	15|15 D3	Start	76,599,476 bp
Band	15|15 D3	End	76,606,373 bp
RNA expression pattern
Bgee	Human / Mouse (ortholog); Top expressed in: gonad; pituitary gland; anterior pituitary; hypothalamus; Brodmann area 9; anterior cingulate cortex; superior frontal gyrus; prefrontal cortex; nucleus accumbens; right hemisphere of cerebellum / Top expressed in: superior frontal gyrus; lumbar subsegment of spinal cord; primary visual cortex; neural layer of retina; dentate gyrus of hippocampal formation granule cell; central gray substance of midbrain; cerebellar cortex; supraoptic nucleus; dorsal tegmental nucleus; hippocampus proper; More reference expression data
BioGPS	n/a
Orthologs
Databases	NCBI: entry; OMA: entry
Species	Human	Mouse
Entrez	441381	378937
Ensembl	ENSG00000254402	ENSMUSG00000033707
UniProt	Q50LG9	Q8BHA1
RefSeq (mRNA)	NM_001024678	NM_198119
RefSeq (protein)	NP_001019849	NP_932787
Location (UCSC)	Chr 8: 144.52 – 144.53 Mb	Chr 15: 76.6 – 76.61 Mb
PubMed search
- Wikidata
View/Edit Human	View/Edit Mouse

Leucine rich repeat containing 24 is a protein that, in humans, is encoded by the LRRC24 gene. The protein is represented by the official symbol LRRC24, and is alternatively known as LRRC14OS. The function of LRRC24 is currently unknown. It is a member of the leucine-rich repeat (LRR) superfamily of proteins.

== Gene ==
In humans, LRRC24 is located on Chromosome 8 (8q24.3). The gene spans approximately 4.66 kb on the opposite strand. LRRC24 is composed of five exons, and only a single gene isoform has been identified.

GeneCards Genomic View for LRRC24 gene

== Protein ==
=== General features ===
LRRC24 is a transmembrane protein of unknown function. Human LRRC24 consists of 513 amino acids including a 23 amino acid signal peptide. The mature form of the protein has a molecular weight of 52.9 kDa. The isoelectric point of the mature human protein is 7.98 The protein is largely composed of alpha helices.

=== Domains ===
LRRC24 is a single-pass transmembrane protein. The protein consists of six leucine-rich repeats and an immunoglobulin-like domain.

Feature	Position(s)	Description
Signal Peptide	1-23	
Domain	24-50	Leucine rich repeat N-terminal domain (LRRNT)
Repeat	51-72	Leucine rich repeat 1 (LRR 1)
Repeat	75-96	LRR 2
Repeat	99-120	LRR 3
Repeat	123-144	LRR 4
Repeat	147-168	LRR 5
Repeat	171-192	LRR 6
Domain	204-257	Leucine rich repeat C-terminal domain (LRRCT)
Domain	259-364	Immunoglobulin-like domain (Ig-like)
Domain	406-426	Transmembrane domain (TMEM)
Motif	427-436	Arginine-rich motif (ARM)

Diagram of LRRC24. Domains are labelled as predicted; grey markers represent confirmed N-linked glycosylated arginine residues (N334 & N363); red marker represents confirmed phorphorylated tyrosine (Y509); Figure created using Prosite MyDomains-Image Creator

=== Localization ===
LRRC24 is a secreted protein as is evidenced by the presence of a signal peptide. The structure of the protein suggests that it localizes to the cell membrane.

== Homology ==
LRRC24 is conserved in Euteleostomi with the exception of Aves. Also, based on sequence homology analysis, distant orthologs of LRRC24 are also conserved in invertebrates of phyla Mollusca and Arthropoda. No human paralogs of LRRC24 have been identified.

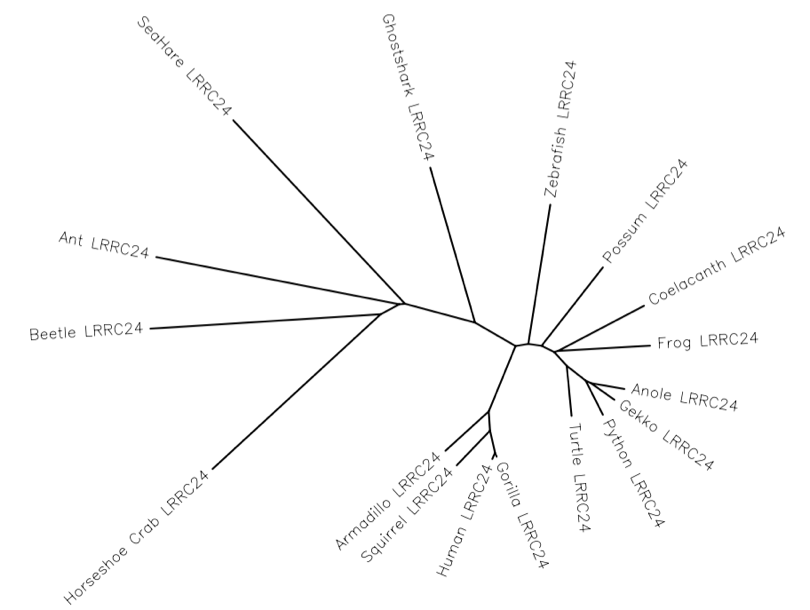
An unrooted phylogenetic tree of LRRC24 orthologs generated using Phylip’s DrawTree and ClustalW.

== Expression ==
Microarray and in situ hybridization experiments suggest LRRC24 is primarily expressed within the brain. Expression is observed to be especially high within the midbrain, neocortex, and tissues of the limbic system, including the hypothalamus and hippocampal formation.

== Interactions ==
Protein-protein interactions of LRRC24 implicate the protein with cell signaling, cell migration, and axon guidance. ROBO2 was found to interact with LRRC24. ROBO2 is a member of the Roundabout gene family, which are well known to play a significant role in nervous system development. Also, LRRC24 was found to interact with LRRTM4, a protein believed to be involved in synaptogenesis, as well as the maintenance of the nervous system in vertebrates.

LRRC24 has also been found to interact with IGFBP7, a known regulator of insulin-like growth factors (IGFs). IGFBP7 is also involved in the stimulation of cell adhesion.

== Clinical significance ==
To date, no study has specifically implicated LRRC24 or the LRRC24 gene with any case of clinical significance.
