= ADAMTSL1 =

Protein-coding gene in humans

Identifiers
- Aliases: ADAMTSL1, ADAMTSL-1, ADAMTSR1, C9orf94, PUNCTIN, ADAMTS like 1
- External IDs: OMIM: 609198; MGI: 1924989; GeneCards: ADAMTSL1

Gene location (Human)
Chr.	Chromosome 9 (human)
Band	9p22.2-p22.1	Start	17,906,563 bp
Band	9p22.2-p22.1	End	18,910,950 bp

Gene location (Mouse)
Chr.	Chromosome 4 (mouse)
Band	4|4 C4	Start	85,432,409 bp
Band	4|4 C4	End	86,346,622 bp
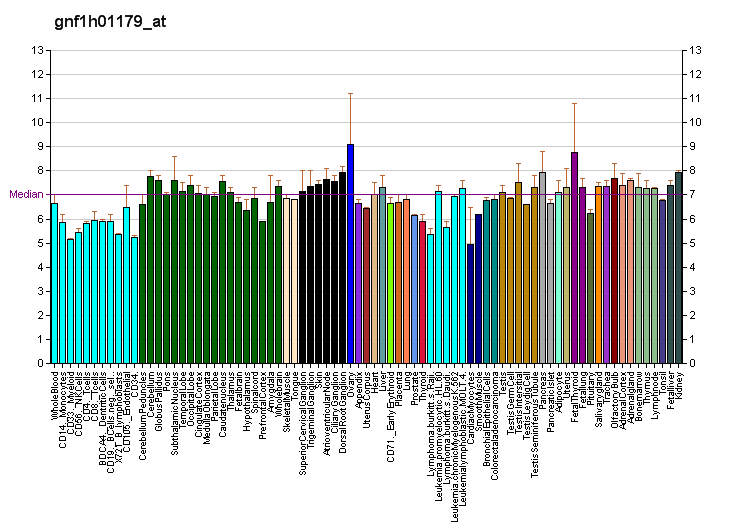
RNA expression pattern
Bgee	Human / Mouse (ortholog); Top expressed in: sural nerve; Descending thoracic aorta; ascending aorta; body of uterus; smooth muscle tissue; testicle; left uterine tube; left adrenal cortex; myometrium; right adrenal cortex / Top expressed in: zygote; lumbar subsegment of spinal cord; otolith organ; sciatic nerve; secondary oocyte; utricle; primary oocyte; efferent ductule; calvaria; umbilical cord; More reference expression data
BioGPS	More reference expression data
Gene ontology
Molecular function	peptidase activity; hydrolase activity
Cellular component	extracellular region; endoplasmic reticulum lumen
Biological process	proteolysis
Sources:Amigo / QuickGO
Orthologs
Databases	NCBI: entry; OMA: entry
Species	Human	Mouse
Entrez	92949	77739
Ensembl	ENSG00000178031	ENSMUSG00000066113
UniProt	Q8N6G6	Q8BLI0
RefSeq (mRNA)	NM_001040272; NM_052866; NM_139238; NM_139264	NM_029967; NM_172542; NM_001368621
RefSeq (protein)	NP_001035362; NP_443098	NP_084243; NP_001355550
Location (UCSC)	Chr 9: 17.91 – 18.91 Mb	Chr 4: 85.43 – 86.35 Mb
PubMed search
- Wikidata
View/Edit Human	View/Edit Mouse

ADAMTS-like protein 1 is a protein that in humans is encoded by the ADAMTSL1 gene.

This gene encodes a secreted protein resembling members of the ADAMTS (a disintegrin and metalloproteinase with thrombospondin motif) family. This protein lacks the propeptide region and the metalloproteinase and disintegrin-like domains, which are typical of the ADAMTS family, but contains other ADAMTS domains, including the thrombospondin type 1 motif. This protein may have important functions in the extracellular matrix. Alternatively spliced transcript variants have been described, but their biological validity has not been determined.
