= MXRA5 =

Protein-coding gene in the species Homo sapiens

Identifiers
- Aliases: MXRA5, matrix remodeling associated 5
- External IDs: OMIM: 300938; GeneCards: MXRA5

Gene location (Human)
Chr.	X chromosome (human)
Band	Xp22.33	Start	3,308,565 bp
Band	Xp22.33	End	3,346,652 bp
RNA expression pattern
Bgee	Human / Mouse (ortholog); Top expressed in: tendon of biceps brachii; hair follicle; skin of hip; urethra; vulva; pylorus; cardia; parietal pleura; nipple; human penis / n/a; More reference expression data
BioGPS	n/a
Gene ontology
Molecular function	molecular function; extracellular matrix structural constituent
Cellular component	extracellular exosome; extracellular region; collagen-containing extracellular matrix
Biological process	response to transforming growth factor beta
Sources:Amigo / QuickGO
Orthologs
Databases	NCBI: entry; OMA: entry
Species	Human	Mouse
Entrez	25878	n/a
Ensembl	ENSG00000101825	n/a
UniProt	Q9NR99	n/a
RefSeq (mRNA)	NM_015419	n/a
RefSeq (protein)	NP_056234	n/a
Location (UCSC)	Chr X: 3.31 – 3.35 Mb	n/a
PubMed search		n/a
- Wikidata
View/Edit Human

Matrix-remodelling associated 5 is a protein in humans that is encoded by the MXRA5 gene.

== Function ==
This gene encodes one of the matrix-remodelling associated proteins. This protein contains 7 leucine-rich repeats and 12 immunoglobulin-like C2-type domains related to perlecan. This gene has a pseudogene on chromosome Y.

== Clinical relevance ==
Mutations in this gene have been seen frequently mutated in cases of non-small-cell lung carcinoma.
