= IRefIndex =

iRefIndex provides an index of protein interactions available in a number of primary interaction databases including BIND, BioGRID, CORUM, DIP, HPRD, InnateDB, IntAct, MatrixDB, MINT, MPact, MPIDB, MPPI and OPHID.
