= Cell adhesion molecule 2 =

Protein involved in attachment of cells

CADM2

Identifiers
- Aliases: CADM2, IGSF4D, NECL3, Necl-3, SynCAM 2, synCAM2, cell adhesion molecule 2
- External IDs: OMIM: 609938; MGI: 2442722; GeneCards: CADM2
Available structures
PDB	Ortholog search: PDBe RCSB
PDB	List of PDB id codes 3M45

Gene location (Human)
Chr.	Chromosome 3 (human)
Band	3p12.1	Start	84,958,989 bp
Band	3p12.1	End	86,074,429 bp

Gene location (Mouse)
Chr.	Chromosome 16 (mouse)
Band	16|16 C1.3- C2	Start	66,452,307 bp
Band	16|16 C1.3- C2	End	67,417,796 bp
RNA expression pattern
Bgee	Human / Mouse (ortholog); Top expressed in: endothelial cell; Brodmann area 23; internal globus pallidus; pars compacta; lateral nuclear group of thalamus; sural nerve; pars reticulata; Brodmann area 46; superior frontal gyrus; primary visual cortex / Top expressed in: primary motor cortex; temporal lobe; substantia nigra; piriform cortex; prefrontal cortex; subdivision of hippocampus; Region I of hippocampus proper; dorsal striatum; olfactory tubercle; lateral geniculate nucleus; More reference expression data
BioGPS	n/a
Gene ontology
Molecular function	signaling receptor binding; protein homodimerization activity; cell adhesion molecule binding
Cellular component	integral component of membrane; axon; cell junction; plasma membrane; cell projection; integral component of plasma membrane; synapse; membrane
Biological process	heterophilic cell-cell adhesion via plasma membrane cell adhesion molecules; cell adhesion; cell recognition; adherens junction organization; homophilic cell adhesion via plasma membrane adhesion molecules
Sources:Amigo / QuickGO
Orthologs
Databases	NCBI: entry; OMA: entry
Species	Human	Mouse
Entrez	253559	239857
Ensembl	ENSG00000175161	ENSMUSG00000064115
UniProt	Q8N3J6	Q8BLQ9
RefSeq (mRNA)	NM_001167674; NM_001167675; NM_001256502; NM_001256503; NM_001256504 NM_001256505; NM_153184; NM_001375960; NM_001375961; NM_001375964; NM_001375967; NM_001375968; NM_001381963; NM_001381964	NM_001145977; NM_178721; NM_001347247
RefSeq (protein)	NP_001161146; NP_001161147; NP_001243431; NP_001243432; NP_001243433 NP_001243434; NP_694854; NP_001362889; NP_001362890; NP_001362893; NP_001362896; NP_001362897; NP_001368892; NP_001368893	NP_001139449; NP_001334176; NP_848836
Location (UCSC)	Chr 3: 84.96 – 86.07 Mb	Chr 16: 66.45 – 67.42 Mb
PubMed search
- Wikidata
View/Edit Human	View/Edit Mouse

Cell adhesion molecule 2 is a protein that, in humans, is encoded by the CADM2 gene. It is one member of a broad family of cell adhesion molecules and is believed to be important in organizing synapses.

== Role in disease ==
=== Measles ===
Research has suggested that CADM2 alongside its family memember CADM1 can act as receptors for Measles virus potentially leading to neurological complications from measles.

== Role in behavior ==
Research has linked variations in CADM2 to a variety of behavioral and lifestyle conditions, including risk-taking behavior, reproductive success, and body mass index/obesity.
