= MDGA2 =

Protein-coding gene in the species Homo sapiens

Identifiers
- Aliases: MDGA2, MAMDC1, c14_5286, MAM domain containing glycosylphosphatidylinositol anchor 2
- External IDs: OMIM: 611128; MGI: 2444706; GeneCards: MDGA2

Gene location (Human)
Chr.	Chromosome 14 (human)
Band	14q21.3	Start	46,839,629 bp
Band	14q21.3	End	47,675,605 bp

Gene location (Mouse)
Chr.	Chromosome 12 (mouse)
Band	12 C2|12 27.63 cM	Start	66,512,834 bp
Band	12 C2|12 27.63 cM	End	67,269,323 bp
RNA expression pattern
Bgee	Human / Mouse (ortholog); Top expressed in: testicle; gonad; ventricular zone; prefrontal cortex; corpus callosum; C1 segment; ganglionic eminence; Brodmann area 9; stromal cell of endometrium; primary visual cortex / Top expressed in: lateral septal nucleus; ventromedial nucleus; supraoptic nucleus; inferior colliculi; paraventricular nucleus of hypothalamus; lateral hypothalamus; medial dorsal nucleus; anterior amygdaloid area; medial geniculate nucleus; globus pallidus; More reference expression data
BioGPS	n/a
Orthologs
Databases	NCBI: entry; OMA: entry
Species	Human	Mouse
Entrez	161357	320772
Ensembl	ENSG00000139915	ENSMUSG00000034912
UniProt	Q7Z553	P60755
RefSeq (mRNA)	NM_001113498; NM_182830	NM_001193266; NM_207010
RefSeq (protein)	NP_001106970; NP_878250	NP_001180195; NP_996893
Location (UCSC)	Chr 14: 46.84 – 47.68 Mb	Chr 12: 66.51 – 67.27 Mb
PubMed search
- Wikidata
View/Edit Human	View/Edit Mouse

MDGA2 (MAM domain containing glycosylphosphatidylinositol anchor 2) is a human gene. It has previously been called MAMDC1. MDGA2 is located on chromosome 14.

The gene has a homologue in rat and mouse, Mdga2, and investigations in rats have found that the gene is expressed in the central and peripheral nervous system in a subpopulation of neurons, e.g., in the basilar pons and cerebral cortex.

There are several variants in the human gene, and a genome-wide association study has pointed to that single-nucleotide polymorphisms in MDGA2 is associated with neuroticism. However, a more recent study has failed to replicate that finding.
