= KAZALD1 =

Protein-coding gene in the species Homo sapiens

Identifiers
- Aliases: KAZALD1, BONO1, FKSG28, FKSG40, IGFBP-rP10, Kazal type serine peptidase inhibitor domain 1
- External IDs: OMIM: 609208; MGI: 2147606; GeneCards: KAZALD1

Gene location (Human)
Chr.	Chromosome 10 (human)
Band	10q24.31	Start	101,061,989 bp
Band	10q24.31	End	101,068,131 bp

Gene location (Mouse)
Chr.	Chromosome 19 (mouse)
Band	19|19 C3	Start	45,063,680 bp
Band	19|19 C3	End	45,067,728 bp
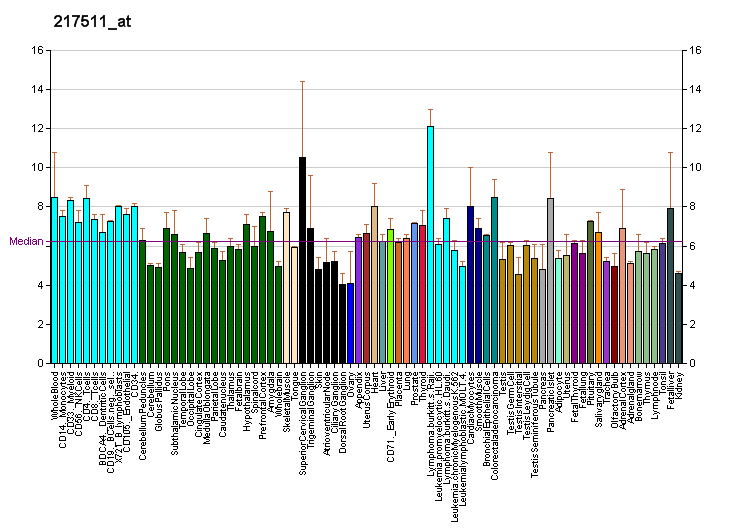

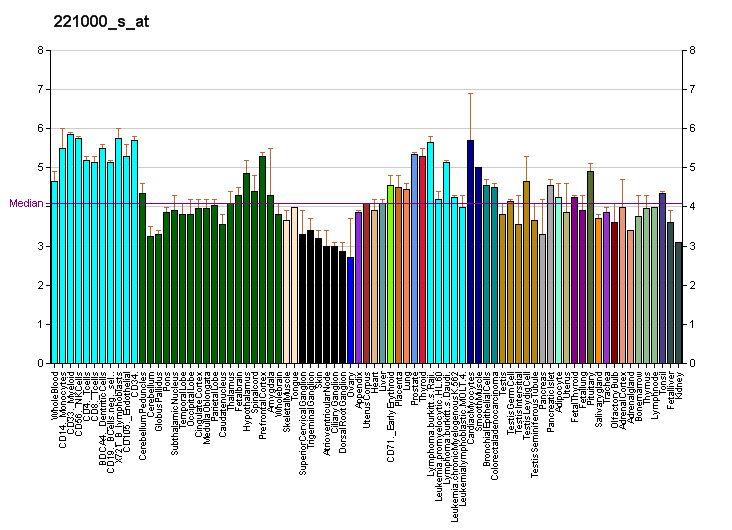
RNA expression pattern
Bgee	Human / Mouse (ortholog); Top expressed in: gonad; spleen; mucosa of transverse colon; apex of heart; parotid gland; Achilles tendon; Descending thoracic aorta; popliteal artery; tibial arteries; body of stomach / Top expressed in: fossa; vestibular sensory epithelium; aortic valve; ascending aorta; body of femur; molar; utricle; Gonadal ridge; calvaria; vestibular membrane of cochlear duct; More reference expression data
BioGPS	More reference expression data
Gene ontology
Molecular function	insulin-like growth factor binding
Cellular component	extracellular region; interstitial matrix; extracellular matrix
Biological process	multicellular organism development; cell differentiation; extracellular matrix organization; regulation of cell growth; ossification
Sources:Amigo / QuickGO
Orthologs
Databases	NCBI: entry; OMA: entry
Species	Human	Mouse
Entrez	81621	107250
Ensembl	ENSG00000107821	ENSMUSG00000025213
UniProt	Q96I82	Q8BJ66
RefSeq (mRNA)	NM_030929; NM_001319303	NM_178929; NM_001362397; NM_001362398
RefSeq (protein)	NP_001306232; NP_112191	NP_849260; NP_001349326; NP_001349327
Location (UCSC)	Chr 10: 101.06 – 101.07 Mb	Chr 19: 45.06 – 45.07 Mb
PubMed search
- Wikidata
View/Edit Human	View/Edit Mouse

Kazal-type serine protease inhibitor domain-containing protein 1 is an enzyme that in humans is encoded by the KAZALD1 gene.
