= PAPLN =

Protein-coding gene in the species Homo sapiens

Identifiers
- Aliases: PAPLN, papilin, proteoglycan like sulfated glycoprotein, PPN
- External IDs: OMIM: 617785; MGI: 2386139; GeneCards: PAPLN

Gene location (Human)
Chr.	Chromosome 14 (human)
Band	14q24.2	Start	73,237,497 bp
Band	14q24.2	End	73,274,640 bp

Gene location (Mouse)
Chr.	Chromosome 12 (mouse)
Band	12|12 D1	Start	83,810,408 bp
Band	12|12 D1	End	83,839,156 bp
RNA expression pattern
Bgee	Human / Mouse (ortholog); Top expressed in: tibial nerve; tendon of biceps brachii; decidua; trigeminal ganglion; spinal ganglia; gastric mucosa; sural nerve; skin of arm; left uterine tube; lymph node / Top expressed in: molar; lip; spermatocyte; esophagus; superior frontal gyrus; yolk sac; neural layer of retina; muscle of thigh; primary visual cortex; spermatid; More reference expression data
BioGPS	n/a
Gene ontology
Molecular function	peptidase inhibitor activity; peptidase activity; serine-type endopeptidase inhibitor activity
Cellular component	extracellular region
Biological process	negative regulation of peptidase activity; negative regulation of endopeptidase activity; proteolysis
Sources:Amigo / QuickGO
Orthologs
Databases	NCBI: entry; OMA: entry
Species	Human	Mouse
Entrez	89932	170721
Ensembl	ENSG00000100767	ENSMUSG00000021223
UniProt	O95428	Q9EPX2
RefSeq (mRNA)	NM_173462; NM_001365906; NM_001365907	NM_001205343; NM_130887
RefSeq (protein)	NP_775733; NP_001352835; NP_001352836	NP_001192272; NP_570957
Location (UCSC)	Chr 14: 73.24 – 73.27 Mb	Chr 12: 83.81 – 83.84 Mb
PubMed search
- Wikidata
View/Edit Human	View/Edit Mouse

Papilin is a protein that in humans is encoded by the PAPLN gene. Papilin is an extracellular matrix glycoprotein.
