= Contactin 3 =

Protein found in humans

CNTN3
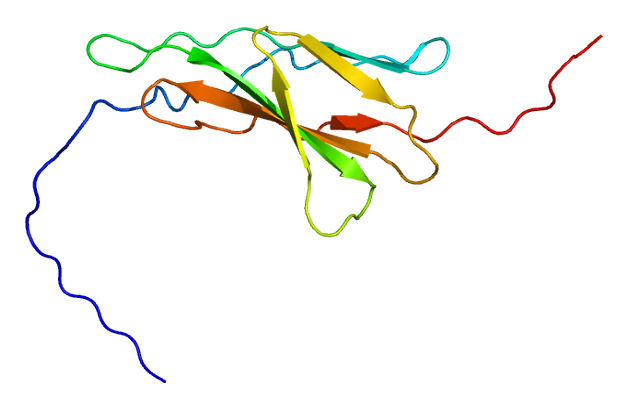

Identifiers
- Aliases: CNTN3, BIG-1, PANG, PCS, contactin 3
- External IDs: OMIM: 601325; MGI: 99534; GeneCards: CNTN3
Available structures
| PDB | Ortholog search: PDBe RCSB |
| PDB | List of PDB id codes 1WJ3 |

Gene location (Human)
| Chr. | Chromosome 3 (human) |
| Band | 3p12.3 | Start | 74,262,568 bp |
| Band | 3p12.3 | End | 74,614,659 bp |

Gene location (Mouse)
| Chr. | Chromosome 6 (mouse) |
| Band | 6 D3|6 47.52 cM | Start | 102,139,616 bp |
| Band | 6 D3|6 47.52 cM | End | 102,550,062 bp |
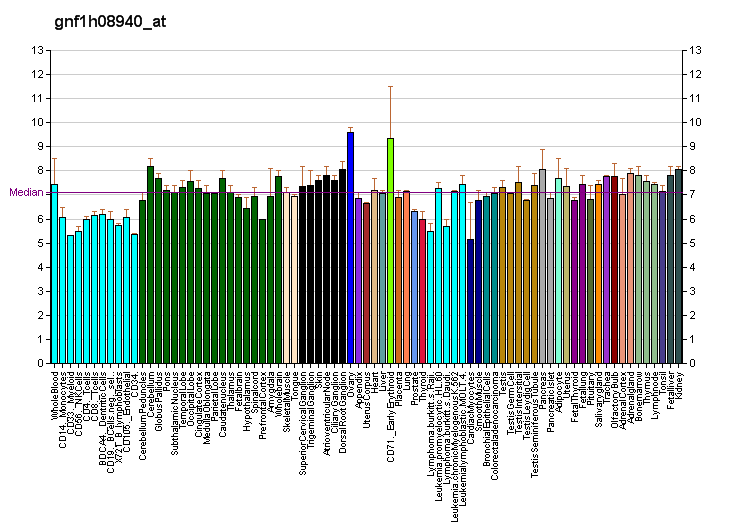
RNA expression pattern
| Bgee | Human / Mouse (ortholog); Top expressed in: Brodmann area 23; endothelial cell; right uterine tube; seminal vesicula; caput epididymis; Brodmann area 46; bronchial epithelial cell; middle temporal gyrus; superior frontal gyrus; retinal pigment epithelium / Top expressed in: lateral septal nucleus; substantia nigra; subiculum; hair; vestibular membrane of cochlear duct; medial dorsal nucleus; lateral geniculate nucleus; anterior amygdaloid area; superior frontal gyrus; stria vascularis; More reference expression data |
| BioGPS | More reference expression data |
Orthologs
| Databases | NCBI: entry; OMA: entry |
| Species | Human | Mouse |
| Entrez | 5067 | 18488 |
| Ensembl | ENSG00000113805 | ENSMUSG00000030075 |
| UniProt | Q9P232 | Q07409 |
| RefSeq (mRNA) | NM_020872; NM_001393376 | NM_008779 |
| RefSeq (protein) | NP_065923 | NP_032805 |
| Location (UCSC) | Chr 3: 74.26 – 74.61 Mb | Chr 6: 102.14 – 102.55 Mb |
| PubMed search |
- Wikidata
| View/Edit Human | View/Edit Mouse |

Contactin-3 is a protein that in humans is encoded by the CNTN3 gene.
