= Nardilysin =

Enzyme found in humans

NRDC

Identifiers
- Aliases: NRDC, hNRD1, hNRD2, NRD1, nardilysin convertase, nardilysin
- External IDs: OMIM: 602651; MGI: 1201386; GeneCards: NRDC
Enzyme activity
EC #	BRENDA	ExPASy	KEGG	MetaCyc
3.4.24.61	↗	↗	↗	↗

Gene location (Human)
Chr.	Chromosome 1 (human)
Band	1p32.3	Start	51,789,191 bp
Band	1p32.3	End	51,878,805 bp

Gene location (Mouse)
Chr.	Chromosome 4 (mouse)
Band	4|4 C7	Start	108,857,852 bp
Band	4|4 C7	End	108,918,974 bp
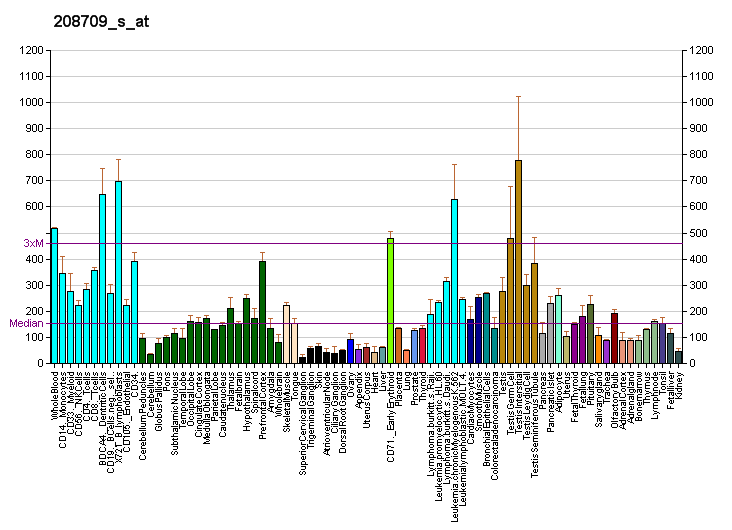
RNA expression pattern
Bgee	Human / Mouse (ortholog); Top expressed in: glutes; right testis; left testis; muscle of thigh; triceps brachii muscle; gastrocnemius muscle; anterior pituitary; sperm; Skeletal muscle tissue of biceps brachii; thoracic diaphragm / Top expressed in: seminiferous tubule; tail of embryo; genital tubercle; granulocyte; spermatid; plantaris muscle; neural layer of retina; muscle of thigh; extensor digitorum longus muscle; lens; More reference expression data
BioGPS	More reference expression data
Gene ontology
Molecular function	peptidase activity; protein binding; catalytic activity; metallopeptidase activity; hydrolase activity; metal ion binding; epidermal growth factor binding; metalloendopeptidase activity
Cellular component	cell surface; cytosol; mitochondrion
Biological process	positive regulation of membrane protein ectodomain proteolysis; cell population proliferation; neuromuscular junction development; cell migration; regulation of endopeptidase activity; proteolysis; negative regulation of cold-induced thermogenesis
Sources:Amigo / QuickGO
Orthologs
Databases	NCBI: entry; OMA: entry
Species	Human	Mouse
Entrez	4898	230598
Ensembl	ENSG00000078618	ENSMUSG00000053510
UniProt	O43847	Q8BHG1
RefSeq (mRNA)	NM_001101662; NM_001242361; NM_002525	NM_146150; NM_001346554; NM_001347169
RefSeq (protein)	NP_001095132; NP_001229290; NP_002516	NP_001333483; NP_001334098; NP_666262
Location (UCSC)	Chr 1: 51.79 – 51.88 Mb	Chr 4: 108.86 – 108.92 Mb
PubMed search
- Wikidata
View/Edit Human	View/Edit Mouse

Nardilysin (EC 3.4.24.61) is an enzyme that in humans is encoded by the gene NRDC (formally NRD1). Nardilysin is a type of protease, which means it functions to cut the bonds between certain amino acids. More specifically, it’s an endopeptidase that cleaves bonds at the N-terminus of arginine residues connected to other basic amino acids. This activity also explains its alternative name, N-arginine dibasic convertase, hence its standard name.

== Interactions ==
Nardilysin has been shown to interact with Heparin-binding EGF-like growth factor.

== Enzyme activity ==
Nardilysin is a type of enzyme also called N-arginine dibasic convertase or NRD-convertase. This enzyme catalyses the following chemical reaction:

Hydrolysis of polypeptides, preferably at -Xaa-Arg-Lys-, and less commonly at -Arg-Arg-Xaa-, in which Xaa is not Arg or Lys
