= Contactin 6 =

Protein found in humans

CNTN6

Identifiers
- Aliases: CNTN6, contactin 6, NB3
- External IDs: OMIM: 607220; MGI: 1858223; GeneCards: CNTN6

Gene location (Mouse)
Chr.	Chromosome 6 (mouse)
Band	6|6 E1	Start	104,492,790 bp
Band	6|6 E1	End	104,863,406 bp
Gene ontology
Molecular function	Notch binding; cell-cell adhesion mediator activity
Cellular component	anchored component of membrane; plasma membrane; membrane; parallel fiber to Purkinje cell synapse; anchored component of presynaptic membrane; axon
Biological process	Notch signaling pathway; central nervous system development; neurogenesis; cell adhesion; nervous system development; neuron differentiation; positive regulation of Notch signaling pathway; homophilic cell adhesion via plasma membrane adhesion molecules; axon guidance; dendrite self-avoidance
Sources:Amigo / QuickGO
Orthologs
Databases	NCBI: entry; OMA: entry
Species	Human	Mouse
Entrez	27255	53870
Ensembl	ENSG00000134115	ENSMUSG00000030092
UniProt	Q9UQ52	Q9JMB8
RefSeq (mRNA)	NM_001289080; NM_001289081; NM_014461	NM_017383
RefSeq (protein)	NP_001276009; NP_001276010; NP_055276; NP_001336279; NP_001336280 NP_001336281; NP_001336282; NP_001336283; NP_001336284; NP_001336285; NP_001336286; NP_001336287; NP_001336288; NP_001336289; NP_001336290; NP_001336291	NP_059079
Location (UCSC)	n/a	Chr 6: 104.49 – 104.86 Mb
PubMed search
- Wikidata
View/Edit Human	View/Edit Mouse

Contactin 6 is a protein in humans that is encoded by the CNTN6 gene.

The protein encoded by this gene is a member of the immunoglobulin superfamily. It is a glycosylphosphatidylinositol (GPI)-anchored neuronal membrane protein that functions as a cell adhesion molecule. It may play a role in the formation of axon connections in the developing nervous system.
