= OPCML =

Protein-coding gene in the species Homo sapiens

Identifiers
- Aliases: OPCML, IGLON1, OBCAM, OPCM, opioid binding protein/cell adhesion molecule-like, opioid binding protein/cell adhesion molecule like
- External IDs: OMIM: 600632; MGI: 97397; GeneCards: OPCML

Gene location (Human)
Chr.	Chromosome 11 (human)
Band	11q25	Start	132,414,977 bp
Band	11q25	End	133,532,501 bp

Gene location (Mouse)
Chr.	Chromosome 9 (mouse)
Band	9 A4|9 13.73 cM	Start	27,790,775 bp
Band	9 A4|9 13.73 cM	End	28,925,410 bp
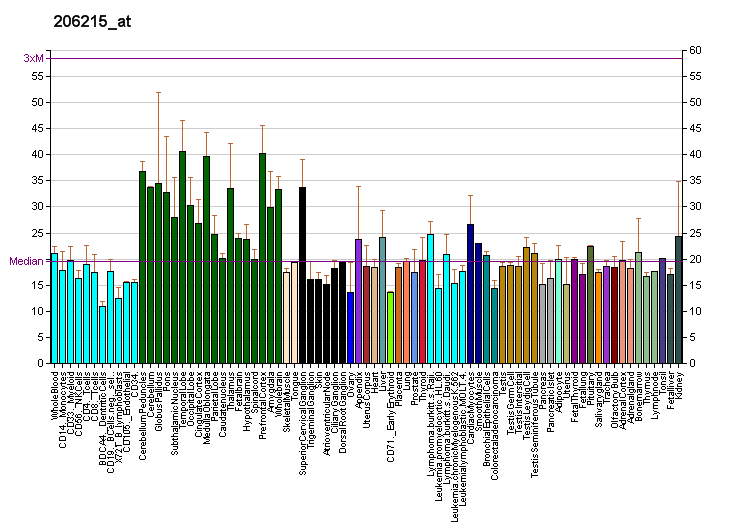
RNA expression pattern
Bgee	Human / Mouse (ortholog); Top expressed in: Brodmann area 23; middle temporal gyrus; endothelial cell; retinal pigment epithelium; orbitofrontal cortex; postcentral gyrus; superior frontal gyrus; Brodmann area 46; entorhinal cortex; Region I of hippocampus proper / Top expressed in: primary motor cortex; lateral septal nucleus; ventromedial nucleus; cingulate gyrus; subiculum; piriform cortex; lateral geniculate nucleus; anterior amygdaloid area; prefrontal cortex; lateral hypothalamus; More reference expression data
BioGPS	More reference expression data
Gene ontology
Molecular function	protein binding
Cellular component	anchored component of membrane; plasma membrane; membrane; extracellular region
Biological process	neuron recognition; cell adhesion
Sources:Amigo / QuickGO
Orthologs
Databases	NCBI: entry; OMA: entry
Species	Human	Mouse
Entrez	4978	330908
Ensembl	ENSG00000183715	ENSMUSG00000062257
UniProt	Q14982	n/a
RefSeq (mRNA)	NM_001012393; NM_002545; NM_001319103; NM_001319104; NM_001319105 NM_001319106	NM_177906
RefSeq (protein)	NP_001012393; NP_001306032; NP_001306033; NP_001306034; NP_001306035 NP_002536; NP_002536.1	n/a
Location (UCSC)	Chr 11: 132.41 – 133.53 Mb	Chr 9: 27.79 – 28.93 Mb
PubMed search
- Wikidata
View/Edit Human	View/Edit Mouse

Opioid-binding protein/cell adhesion molecule is a protein that in humans is encoded by the OPCML gene.

This gene encodes a member of the IgLON subfamily in the immunoglobulin protein superfamily. The encoded protein is localized in the cell membrane and may have an accessory role in opioid receptor function. This gene has an ortholog in rat and bovine. The opioid binding-cell adhesion molecule encoded by the rat gene binds opioid alkaloids in the presence of acidic lipids, exhibits selectivity for mu ligands and acts as a GPI-anchored protein. Since the encoded protein is highly conserved in species during evolution, it may have a fundamental role in mammalian systems. Two transcript variants encoding different isoforms have been found for this gene.
