= WFIKKN1 =

Protein-coding gene in the species Homo sapiens

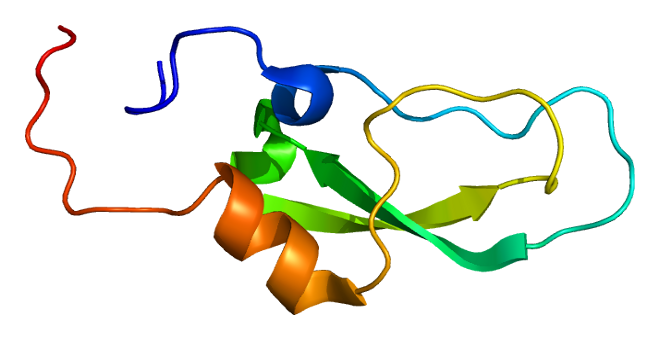

Identifiers
- Aliases: WFIKKN1, C16orf12, RJD2, WFDC20A, WFIKKN, WAP, follistatin/kazal, immunoglobulin, kunitz and netrin domain containing 1
- External IDs: OMIM: 608021; MGI: 2670967; GeneCards: WFIKKN1
Available structures
| PDB | Ortholog search: PDBe RCSB |
| PDB | List of PDB id codes 2DDI, 2DDJ |

Gene location (Human)
| Chr. | Chromosome 16 (human) |
| Band | 16p13.3 | Start | 629,239 bp |
| Band | 16p13.3 | End | 634,117 bp |

Gene location (Mouse)
| Chr. | Chromosome 17 (mouse) |
| Band | 17|17 A3.3 | Start | 26,096,602 bp |
| Band | 17|17 A3.3 | End | 26,099,832 bp |
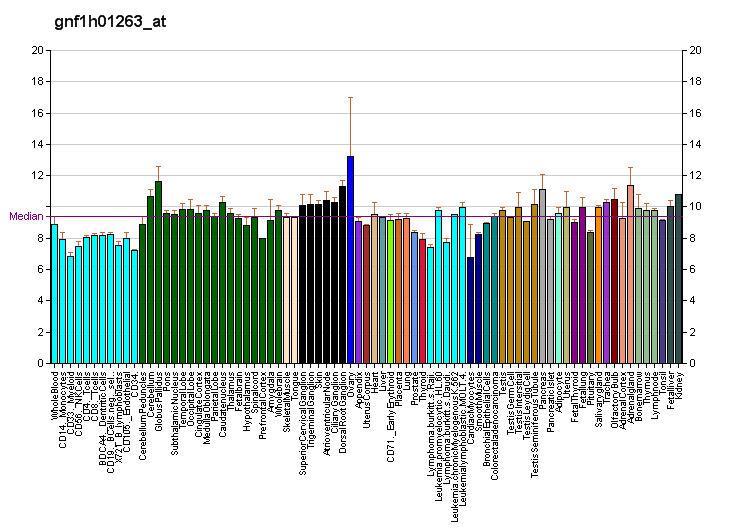
RNA expression pattern
| Bgee | Human / Mouse (ortholog); Top expressed in: right hemisphere of cerebellum; mucosa of transverse colon; right frontal lobe; pituitary gland; putamen; Brodmann area 9; anterior cingulate cortex; anterior pituitary; nucleus accumbens; skin of abdomen / Top expressed in: otic vesicle; primitive streak; embryo; somite; morula; tail of embryo; granulocyte; embryo; blastocyst; yolk sac; More reference expression data |
| BioGPS | More reference expression data |
Gene ontology
| Molecular function | peptidase inhibitor activity; enzyme inhibitor activity; protein binding; metalloendopeptidase inhibitor activity; serine-type endopeptidase inhibitor activity; receptor antagonist activity; transforming growth factor beta binding |
| Cellular component | extracellular region |
| Biological process | skeletal system development; negative regulation of DNA binding; roof of mouth development; negative regulation of peptidase activity; negative regulation of protein binding; negative regulation of endopeptidase activity; negative regulation of transforming growth factor beta receptor signaling pathway; extracellular negative regulation of signal transduction; negative regulation of signaling receptor activity |
Sources:Amigo / QuickGO
Orthologs
| Databases | NCBI: entry; OMA: entry |
| Species | Human | Mouse |
| Entrez | 117166 | 215001 |
| Ensembl | ENSG00000127578 | ENSMUSG00000071192 |
| UniProt | Q96NZ8 | Q8R0S6 |
| RefSeq (mRNA) | NM_053284 | NM_001100454 |
| RefSeq (protein) | NP_444514 | NP_001093924 |
| Location (UCSC) | Chr 16: 0.63 – 0.63 Mb | Chr 17: 26.1 – 26.1 Mb |
| PubMed search |
- Wikidata
| View/Edit Human | View/Edit Mouse |

WAP, kazal, immunoglobulin, kunitz and NTR domain-containing protein 1 is a protein that is encoded by the WFIKKN1 gene. when found in humans.

This gene encodes a secreted multidomain protein consisting of a signal peptide, a WAP domain, a follistatin domain, an immunoglobulin domain, two tandem Kunitz domains, and an NTR domain. These domains have been implicated frequently in inhibition of various types of proteases, suggesting that the encoded protein may be a multivalent protease inhibitor and may control the action of multiple types of serine proteases as well as metalloproteinases.
