= Contactin 4 =

Protein found in humans

CNTN4

Identifiers
- Aliases: CNTN4, AXCAM, BIG-2, contactin 4
- External IDs: OMIM: 607280; MGI: 1095737; GeneCards: CNTN4
Available structures
PDB	Ortholog search: PDBe RCSB
PDB	List of PDB id codes 3JXA, 3KLD

Gene location (Human)
Chr.	Chromosome 3 (human)
Band	3p26.3-p26.2	Start	2,098,813 bp
Band	3p26.3-p26.2	End	3,057,959 bp

Gene location (Mouse)
Chr.	Chromosome 6 (mouse)
Band	6|6 E1	Start	105,677,660 bp
Band	6|6 E1	End	106,699,310 bp
RNA expression pattern
Bgee	Human / Mouse (ortholog); Top expressed in: sperm; buccal mucosa cell; lateral nuclear group of thalamus; pancreatic epithelial cell; saphenous vein; thoracic aorta; ascending aorta; Descending thoracic aorta; popliteal artery; tibial arteries / Top expressed in: olfactory epithelium; medial dorsal nucleus; medial geniculate nucleus; lateral geniculate nucleus; neural layer of retina; supraoptic nucleus; cerebellar cortex; cerebellar vermis; superior frontal gyrus; secondary oocyte; More reference expression data
BioGPS	n/a
Gene ontology
Molecular function	cell-cell adhesion mediator activity
Cellular component	anchored component of membrane; axon; membrane; extracellular region; plasma membrane
Biological process	neuron cell-cell adhesion; cell adhesion; axonal fasciculation; negative regulation of neuron differentiation; axonogenesis; nervous system development; regulation of synaptic plasticity; axon guidance; brain development; neuron projection development; homophilic cell adhesion via plasma membrane adhesion molecules; dendrite self-avoidance
Sources:Amigo / QuickGO
Orthologs
Databases	NCBI: entry; OMA: entry
Species	Human	Mouse
Entrez	152330	269784
Ensembl	ENSG00000144619	ENSMUSG00000064293
UniProt	Q8IWV2	Q69Z26
RefSeq (mRNA)	NM_001206955; NM_001206956; NM_175607; NM_175612; NM_175613 NM_001350095	NM_001109749; NM_001109751; NM_173004; NM_001364565; NM_001364566
RefSeq (protein)	NP_001193884; NP_001193885; NP_783200; NP_783302; NP_001337024	NP_001103219; NP_001103221; NP_766592; NP_001351494; NP_001351495
Location (UCSC)	Chr 3: 2.1 – 3.06 Mb	Chr 6: 105.68 – 106.7 Mb
PubMed search
- Wikidata
View/Edit Human	View/Edit Mouse

Contactin-4 is a protein that in humans is encoded by the CNTN4 gene.

The protein encoded by this gene is a member of the immunoglobulin superfamily. It is a glycosylphosphatidylinositol (GPI)-anchored neuronal membrane protein that functions as a cell adhesion molecule. It may play a role in the formation of axon connections in the developing nervous system. Several alternatively spliced transcript variants of this gene have been described, but the full-length nature of some of these variants has not been determined.

== Genomics ==
The gene is located on the short arm of chromosome 3 (3p26.3). It is a single copy gene within the Watson (plus) strand, 957,399 bases in length and encodes a protein of 1026 amino acids (molecular weight 113.454 kDa)

== Clinical relevance ==
Abnormal expression of this gene has been implicated in some cases of autism. It has also been associated with cerebellar degeneration in spinocerebellar ataxia type 16.
