= LMLN =

Protein-coding gene in the species Homo sapiens

Identifiers
- Aliases: LMLN, GP63, INV, IX14, MSP, leishmanolysin like peptidase, LMNL1
- External IDs: OMIM: 609380; MGI: 2444736; GeneCards: LMLN

Gene location (Human)
Chr.	Chromosome 3 (human)
Band	3q29	Start	197,960,200 bp
Band	3q29	End	198,043,720 bp

Gene location (Mouse)
Chr.	Chromosome 16 (mouse)
Band	16|16 B3	Start	32,882,891 bp
Band	16|16 B3	End	32,948,065 bp
RNA expression pattern
Bgee	Human / Mouse (ortholog); Top expressed in: bronchial epithelial cell; corpus epididymis; secondary oocyte; caput epididymis; mucosa of paranasal sinus; Brodmann area 23; tail of epididymis; pancreatic ductal cell; sperm; middle temporal gyrus / Top expressed in: otolith organ; utricle; neural layer of retina; substantia nigra; spermatocyte; trigeminal ganglion; Rostral migratory stream; ventromedial nucleus; cumulus cell; retinal pigment epithelium; More reference expression data
BioGPS	n/a
Gene ontology
Molecular function	peptidase activity; metalloendopeptidase activity; hydrolase activity; metallopeptidase activity; metal ion binding
Cellular component	lipid droplet; membrane; focal adhesion; cytoplasm; cytosol
Biological process	cell cycle; cell adhesion; proteolysis; cell division
Sources:Amigo / QuickGO
Orthologs
Databases	NCBI: entry; OMA: entry
Species	Human	Mouse
Entrez	89782	239833
Ensembl	ENSG00000185621	ENSMUSG00000022802
UniProt	Q96KR4	Q8BMN4
RefSeq (mRNA)	NM_001136049; NM_033029	NM_172823
RefSeq (protein)	NP_001129521; NP_149018	NP_766411
Location (UCSC)	Chr 3: 197.96 – 198.04 Mb	Chr 16: 32.88 – 32.95 Mb
PubMed search
- Wikidata
View/Edit Human	View/Edit Mouse

Leishmanolysin-like (metallopeptidase M8 family) is a protein that in humans is encoded by the LMLN gene.

== Function ==
This gene encodes a zinc-metallopeptidase. The encoded protein may play a role in cell migration and invasion. Studies of a similar protein in Drosophila indicate a potential role in mitotic progression. Alternatively spliced transcript variants have been described. [provided by RefSeq, Feb 2009].

== Clinical Significance ==
Clinical information about the LMLN is limited to the aforementioned functional associations, rather than constituting a defined disease spectrum. No pathogenic variants linked to this gene have yet been identified, however, scientific literature suggests a role for it in a cell invasion and migration processes. Currently there are no specific treatments that target this gene.
