= Contactin 1 =

Protein found in humans

CNTN1

Identifiers
- Aliases: CNTN1, F3, GP135, MYPCN, contactin 1
- External IDs: OMIM: 600016; MGI: 105980; GeneCards: CNTN1
Available structures
PDB	Ortholog search: PDBe RCSB
PDB	List of PDB id codes 2EE2, 3S97

Gene location (Human)
Chr.	Chromosome 12 (human)
Band	12q12	Start	40,692,439 bp
Band	12q12	End	41,072,415 bp

Gene location (Mouse)
Chr.	Chromosome 15 (mouse)
Band	15 E3|15 46.39 cM	Start	91,949,046 bp
Band	15 E3|15 46.39 cM	End	92,239,848 bp
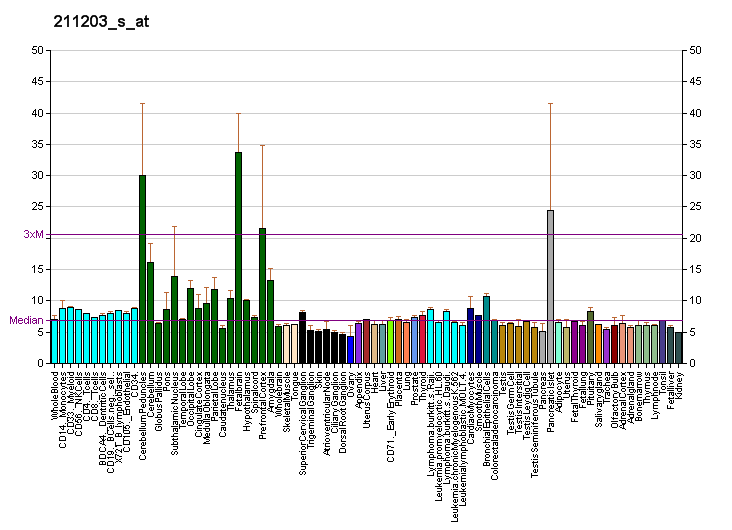
RNA expression pattern
Bgee	Human / Mouse (ortholog); Top expressed in: Brodmann area 23; endothelial cell; superior frontal gyrus; postcentral gyrus; entorhinal cortex; prefrontal cortex; cerebellar cortex; primary visual cortex; amygdala; cerebellar hemisphere / Top expressed in: lateral geniculate nucleus; ventromedial nucleus; lateral septal nucleus; medial geniculate nucleus; mammillary body; ventral tegmental area; medial dorsal nucleus; lateral hypothalamus; anterior amygdaloid area; globus pallidus; More reference expression data
BioGPS	More reference expression data
Gene ontology
Molecular function	carbohydrate binding; protein binding
Cellular component	myelin sheath; anchored component of membrane; membrane raft; plasma membrane; extracellular exosome; membrane; anchored component of postsynaptic membrane; anchored component of presynaptic membrane
Biological process	positive regulation of peptidyl-tyrosine phosphorylation; nervous system development; cell adhesion; positive regulation of gene expression; neuron projection development; positive regulation of sodium ion transport; cerebellum development; positive regulation of neuron projection development; Notch signaling pathway
Sources:Amigo / QuickGO
Orthologs
Databases	NCBI: entry; OMA: entry
Species	Human	Mouse
Entrez	1272	12805
Ensembl	ENSG00000018236	ENSMUSG00000055022
UniProt	Q12860	P12960
RefSeq (mRNA)	NM_001256063; NM_001256064; NM_001843; NM_175038	NM_001159647; NM_001159648; NM_007727; NM_001358051
RefSeq (protein)	NP_001242992; NP_001242993; NP_001834; NP_778203	NP_001153119; NP_001153120; NP_031753; NP_001344980
Location (UCSC)	Chr 12: 40.69 – 41.07 Mb	Chr 15: 91.95 – 92.24 Mb
PubMed search
- Wikidata
View/Edit Human	View/Edit Mouse

Contactin 1 (CNTN1) is a protein which in humans is encoded by the CNTN1 gene.

== Function ==
The protein encoded by this gene is a member of the immunoglobulin superfamily. It is a glycosylphosphatidylinositol (GPI)-anchored neuronal membrane protein that functions as a cell adhesion molecule. It may play a role in the formation of axon connections in the developing nervous system. Two alternatively spliced transcript variants encoding different isoforms have been described for this gene.

== Interactions ==
CNTN1 has been shown to interact with PTPRB.

== Associated diseases ==
Mutations are associated with Compton–North congenital myopathy.
