= Latisemin =

Latisemin is a cysteine-rich secretory protein that can be isolated from the venom of the Black-banded sea krait, a sea snake indigenous to the warmer waters of the western Pacific Ocean. It is a toxin that inhibits cyclic nucleotide-gated ion channels and blocks L-type calcium channels, thereby reducing smooth muscle contraction.

== Sources ==
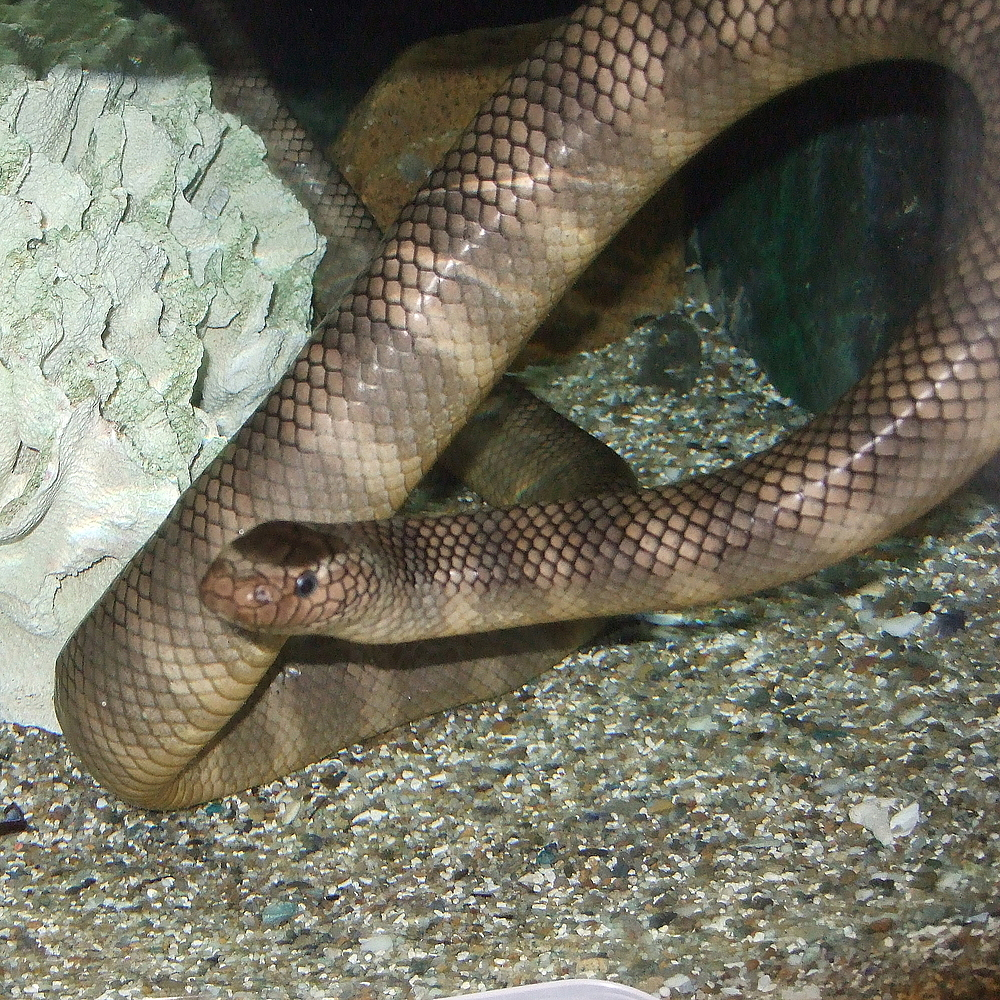
Black-banded sea krait (Laticauda semifasciata), known in Okinawa as the Erabu snake

Latisemin is a component of the venom produced by the Erabu sea snake (Laticauda semifasciata) of the family Elapidae and the Laticauda genus. These sea snakes inhabit coral reef areas in the seas of Southern Japan, Southeast Asia, and Australia. Though highly venomous, this snake is comparatively unaggressive, and is in fact caught and eaten in Erabu soup in Japan.

== Biochemistry ==
Latisemin has a molecular weight of 24 kDa and consists of 217 amino acids. It belongs to the CRISP (cysteine-rich secretory protein) glycoprotein subfamily, which are single chain polypeptides containing strictly conserved cysteines (cysteines not oxidised to cystine and thus not providing disulfide bond support to tertiary protein structure). They are secretory proteins, meaning they are secreted from cells into extracellular fluid.

== Target ==
Latisemin strongly blocks depolarization- (but not caffeine-) induced smooth muscle contraction, suggesting that it blocks L-type calcium channels. Its mode of action is similar to that of some other snake venom toxins from the CRISP family, like ablomin from the Japanese Mamushi snake and triflin from the Habu snake. They also inhibit cyclic nucleotide-gated ion channels.

== See also ==
Other snake venom proteins in the CRISP family:

- Ablomin from the Japanese Mamushi snake (Gloydius blomhoffii)
- Ophanin from the King Cobra (Ophiophagus hannah)
- Piscivorin from the Eastern Cottonmouth (Agkistrodon piscivorus)
- Triflin from the Habu snake (Trimeresurus flavoviridis)
