= Habu =

Habu (波布) is a Ryukyuan name referring to certain venomous snakes:

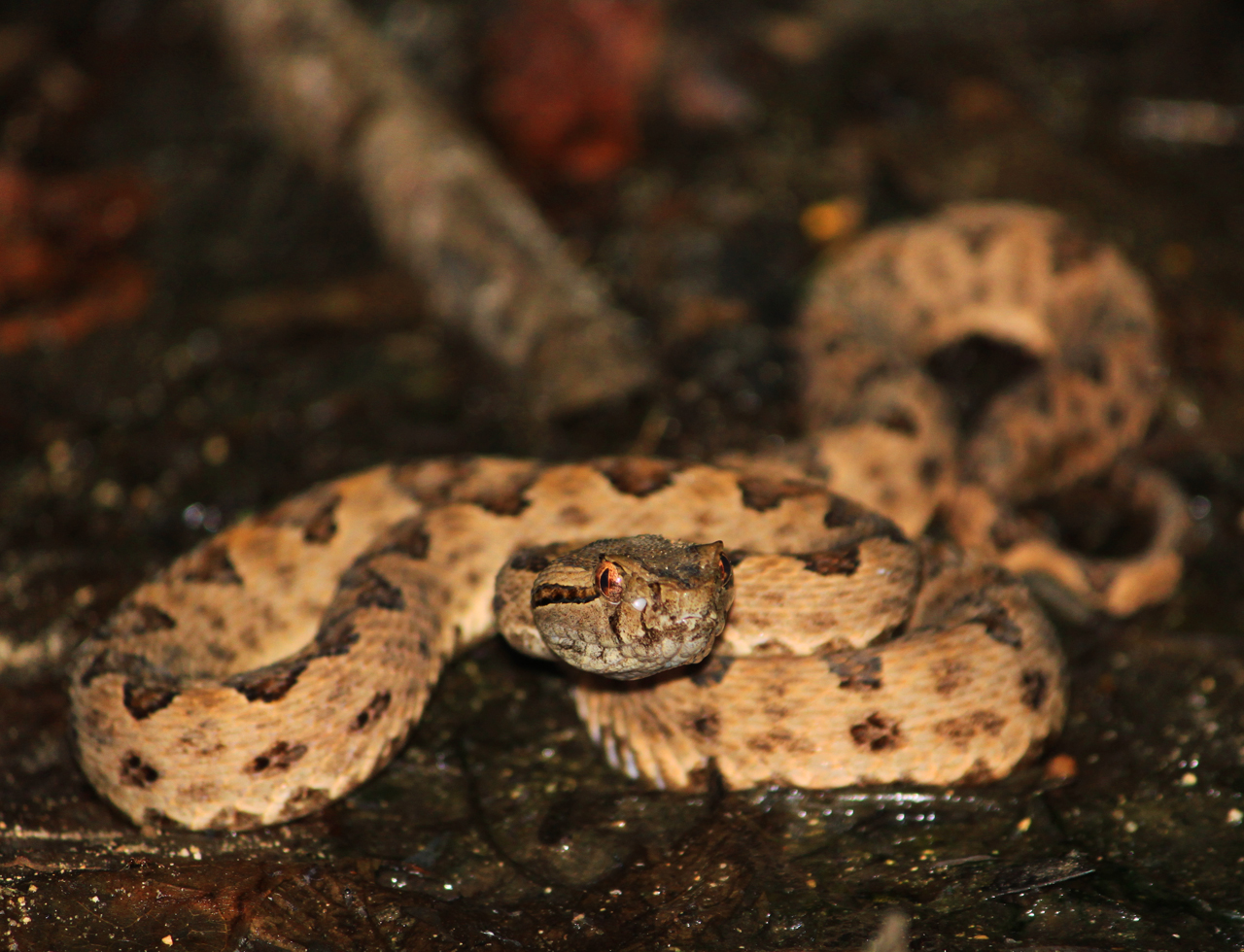
Sakishima habu at Kohama Island, Okinawa

- The following species are found in the Ryukyu Islands of Japan:
  - Protobothrops elegans, a.k.a. the Sakishima habu, found in the southern Ryukyu Islands
  - Protobothrops flavoviridis, a.k.a. the Okinawan habu, found in the southern Ryukyu Islands
  - Protobothrops tokarensis, a.k.a. the Tokara habu, found in the Tokara Islands
  - Ovophis okinavensis, a.k.a. the Hime habu
- Habu is a name also used for several other species:
  - Trimeresurus gracilis, a.k.a. the Kikushi habu, found in Taiwan.
  - Protobothrops mucrosquamatus, a.k.a. the Taiwan habu or Chinese habu, found in Southeast Asia.
  - Ovophis monticola, a.k.a. the Arisan habu, found in Southeast Asia.
- Habu is a nickname given to the Lockheed SR-71 Blackbird strategic reconnaissance aircraft of the United States Air Force.
