= Cysteine-rich secretory protein =

Crisp domain (CRD)
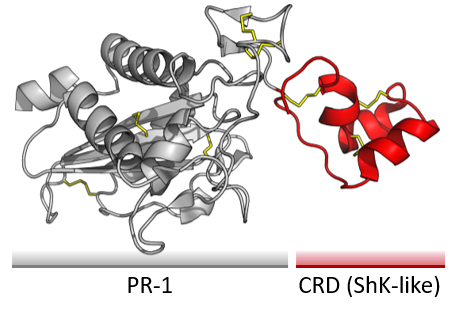
- The two domains of a Cysteine-rich secretory protein (CRISP). CAP-like PR-1 domain in white. ShK-like CRD in red. Disulphides in yellow. Glycan chains not shown. (PDB: 1WVR)

Identifiers
- Symbol: Crisp
- Pfam: PF08562
- Pfam clan: CL0213
- InterPro: IPR013871
Available protein structures:
- Pfam: structures / ECOD
- PDB: RCSB PDB; PDBe; PDBj
- PDBsum: structure summary

Cysteine-rich secretory proteins, often abbreviated as CRISPs, are a group of glycoproteins. They are a subgroup of the CRISP, antigen 5 and Pr-1 (CAP) protein superfamily and also contain a domain related to the ShK toxins. They are substantially implicated in the functioning of the mammalian reproductive system. CRISPs are also found in a variety of snake venoms where they inhibit both smooth muscle contraction and cyclic nucleotide-gated ion channels.

== Structure ==
CRISPs contain two domains joined by a hinge region. The larger domain is a CAP-like 'Pathogenesis-related 1' domain (PR-1), followed by the smaller ShK-like 'Cysteine-Rich Domain' (CRD).

CRISPs are glycoproteins, with a number of carbohydrate glycans covalently attached to amino acid side-chains on their surface via glycosylation. The primary structure is also rich in cysteine that form disulfide bonds, particularly in the hinge region and CRD.

== Mammalian reproduction ==
CRISPs are found in the testes and epididymis of mammals, and are also involved in the process of fertilisation. In the spermatogenesis process (development of the spermatozoa in the testis), the CRISP2 protein is incorporated into the acrosome where it is believed to be involved in the adhesion of germ cells with Sertoli cells. CRISP2 also forms part of the sperm tail where it is thought to be involved in regulating flagellar beating. Proteins CRISP1 and CRISP4 are both found in the epididymis where they are also incorporated within the spermatozoa as it matures. Protein CRISP3 is found in seminal fluid, excreted from the prostate although its function is unknown.

During capacitation, the penultimate stage of spermatozoa maturation, the acrosomal sperm head membrane is destabilised to allow greater binding between oocyte and sperm. CRISP1 binds to surface of the sperm leading to a quiescent state of storage prior to capacitation. The mechanism is believed to involve inhibition of ion channel activity, similar to the mechanism of action of the other major function of CRISPs in snake venom. Research also suggests that CRISPs are involved in the oocyte-sperm binding needed for fertilisation. Given the involvement of CRISPs in several stages of human reproduction, it is unsurprising that applications in treatment of infertility and as contraceptives are being actively investigated.

== Snake venom ==
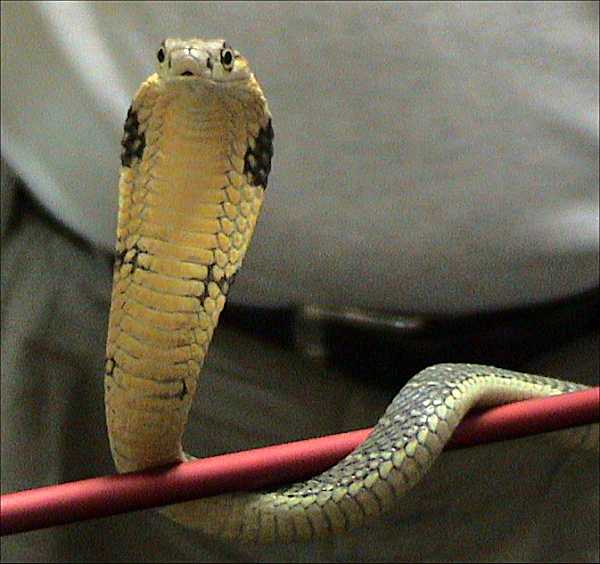
The King Cobra (Ophiophagus hannah) for which the CRISP ophanin is named

CRISPs are found in the venom of a wide variety of snake species. Examples include ablomin from the Japanese Mamushi snake (Gloydius blomhoffii, formerly Agkistrodon blomhoffi), latisemin from the Erabu sea snake (Laticauda semifasciata), ophanin from the King Cobra (Ophiophagus hannah), piscivorin from the Eastern Cottonmouth (Agkistrodon piscivorus) and triflin from the Habu snake (Trimeresurus flavoviridis) – each of these proteins is named for the snake species in which it was discovered. These venoms are toxic due to their blocking of calcium channels and also because they reduce potassium-induced smooth muscle contraction. Among the four CRISPs isolated from the Monocled Cobra (Naja kaouthia) and the three from the Egyptian Cobra (Naja haje), ion channel activity occurred by blocking of cyclic nucleotide-gated ion channels. One of the N. haje CRISPs was the first example of an acidic CRISP in reptilian venom. The selective ion channel activity of snake CRISPs, coupled with the variety of CRISPs available as the pool of venom proteins appears highly variable between (at least) cobra species, provide a valuable tool for probing the mechanisms of ion channel activity.
