= Okinawa habu =

Okinawa habu may refer to:

- Protobothrops elegans or Trimeresurus elegans, a.k.a. the elegant pitviper or Sakishima habu, a venomous snake found in the southern Ryukyu Islands of Japan.
- Protobothrops flavoviridis or Trimeresurus flavoviridis, a.k.a. Habu or Hon habu, a venomous pitviper found in the Ryukyu Islands of Japan
- Ovophis okinavensis, a.k.a. the himehabu, a venomous pitviper found in the Ryukyu Islands of Japan

These snakes also inspired a nickname of an aircraft with a forward operating base at Okinawa, the Lockheed SR-71 Blackbird.
