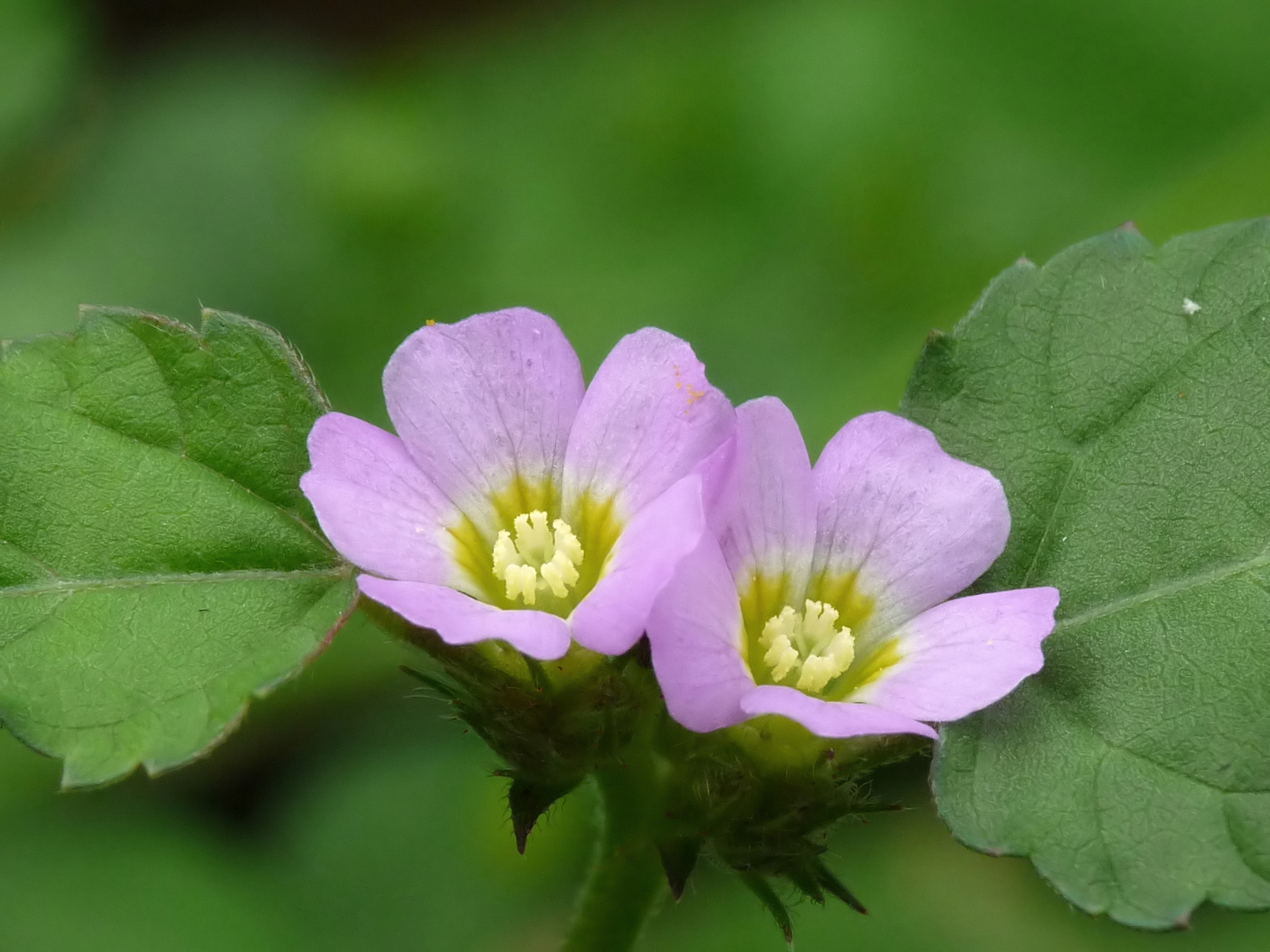

Scientific classification
- Kingdom: Plantae
- Clade: Tracheophytes
- Clade: Angiosperms
- Clade: Eudicots
- Clade: Rosids
- Order: Malvales
- Family: Malvaceae
- Genus: Melochia
- Species: M. corchorifolia

Binomial name
- Melochia corchorifolia L.

= Melochia corchorifolia =

Species of flowering plant

Melochia corchorifolia, the chocolateweed, is a weedy tropical plant that is typically seen in the wastelands. It has been most frequently observed to grow in open areas, such as highways. Its weedy and invasive characteristic inhibits its wider cultivation.

== Distribution ==
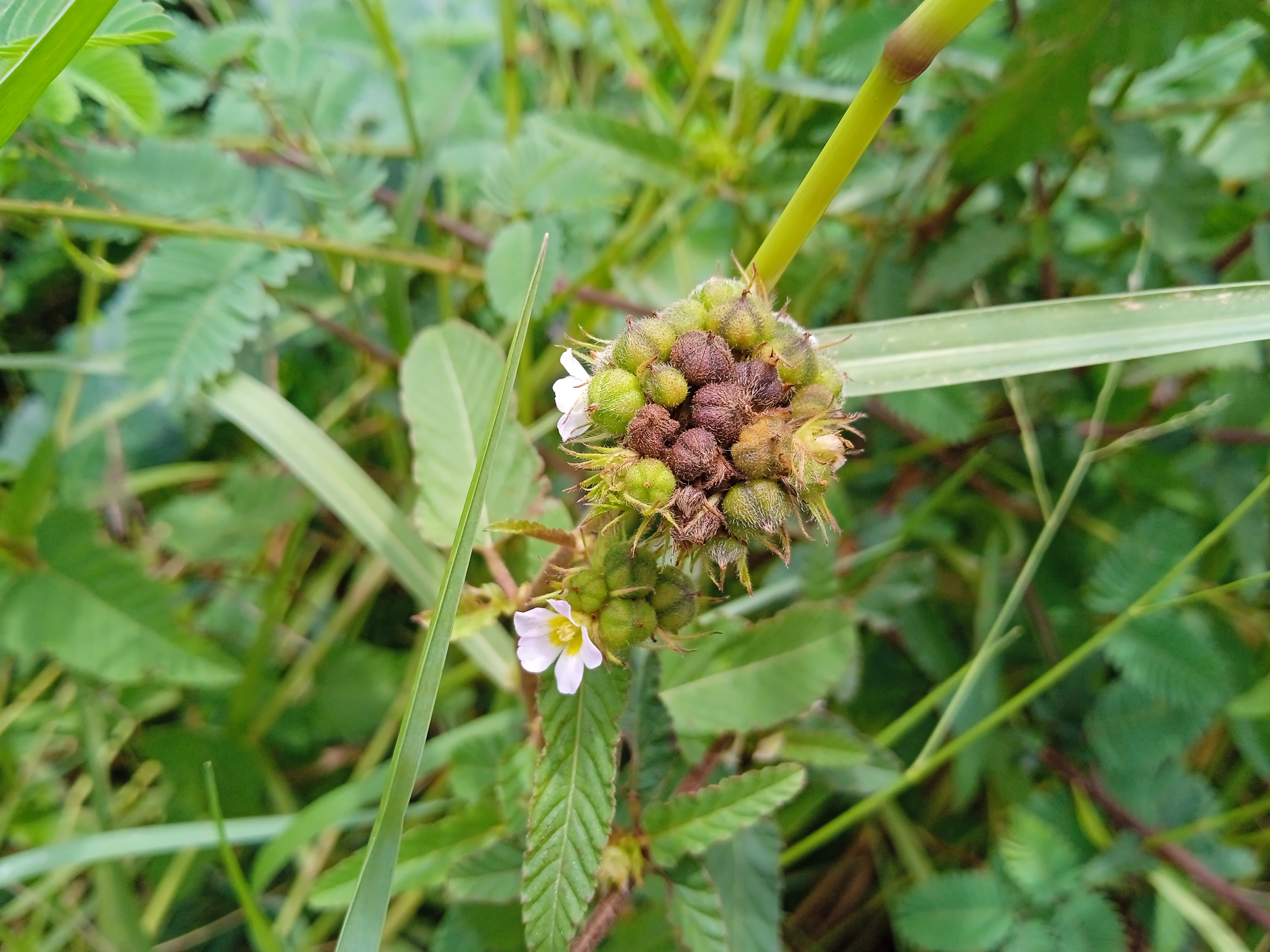
M. corchorifolia

Melochia corchorifolia is common in the Southeastern regions of the United States. It has been observed to grow from North Carolina to all the way south into Mississippi. In addition, it is prevalent in tropical areas of Africa, Asia and Australia. Sunny or dimly shaded humid regions of riversides, lakesides are its familiar natural habitats. This plant also grows typically as weed in cotton, soybean and rice plants.

== Morphology ==
Melochia corchorifolia has ovate leaves; the petioles are generally 5 cm long with linear stipules of 6 mm long. The veins extend to be from 7 cm long to 5 cm long. This plant is an annual or perennial type of herb. It usually develops to be up to 1.3–2.0 m tall; stem with line of stellate hairs. It’s simple, ovate leaves are normally arranged spirally with the margins very intensely serrated. The blade of the leaves range from narrow to broad to the tip, measures up to 7.5 cm × 5.5 cm.

== Flowers and fruit ==
The inflorescence of Melochia corchorifolia comprises crowded cymes with linear bracts. This plant species has flowers of 5 green sepals. The flower of Melochia corchorifolia is purple, with 5 petals, 5–7 mm long. Flowers are bisexual, regular with calyx campanulate of 3 mm long. It is also short-teethed and consists of petals of 8 mm long, white with yellow base inside. The stamens are fused close to the top of the filaments. This purple flower has superior ovary with 5 styles joint at the base. The flowering occurs from July to October.

The fruit contains a 5-valved capsule which measures up to 5 mm in diameter. It holds very few seed, approximately 1 seed per locule. The seeds are wrinkled and brown, about 2.0 – 2.5 mm long in length. Fruits usually develop from September to December.

== Reproduction ==
The proliferation is completed via seed. It is often thought that germination can be better significantly by scarification. With scarified seed, germination is done at temperatures of 35–40 °C. Additionally, Melochia corchorifolia L is observed to be a host of fungal diseases, such as Rhizoctonia solani.

== Usage ==
Melochia corchorifolia was used as a source of fibre for making dillybags and other objects in the north-central Arnhem Land region. It was noted as a source of very strong fibre. is not utilized for decoration or food purposes. However, it contains several phytochemical features. For example, its leaves have been analyzed to have triterpenes (friedelin, friedelinol and β-amyrin), flavonol glycosides (hibifolin, triflin and melocorin), aliphatic compounds, flavonoids (vitexin and robunin), β-D-sitosterol β-D-glucoside and alkaloids. These naturally occurring alkaloids help in plant growth and contains nitrogen.

=== Food ===
The leaves of Melochia corchorifolia are consumed as a potherb in West Africa and southern Africa. The cooked leaves present a popular, slimy side-dish in Malawi. Such utilization of the leaves are also quite common in Indo-China and India. Additionally, the stems are used for tying bundles and are used in the construction of roofs of houses.
