= Triflin =

Triflin is a cysteine-rich secretory protein (CRISP), which is excreted by the venom gland of the Habu snake (Trimeresurus flavoviridis). Triflin reduces high potassium-induced smooth muscle contraction, suggesting a blocking effect on L-type calcium channels.

== Sources ==
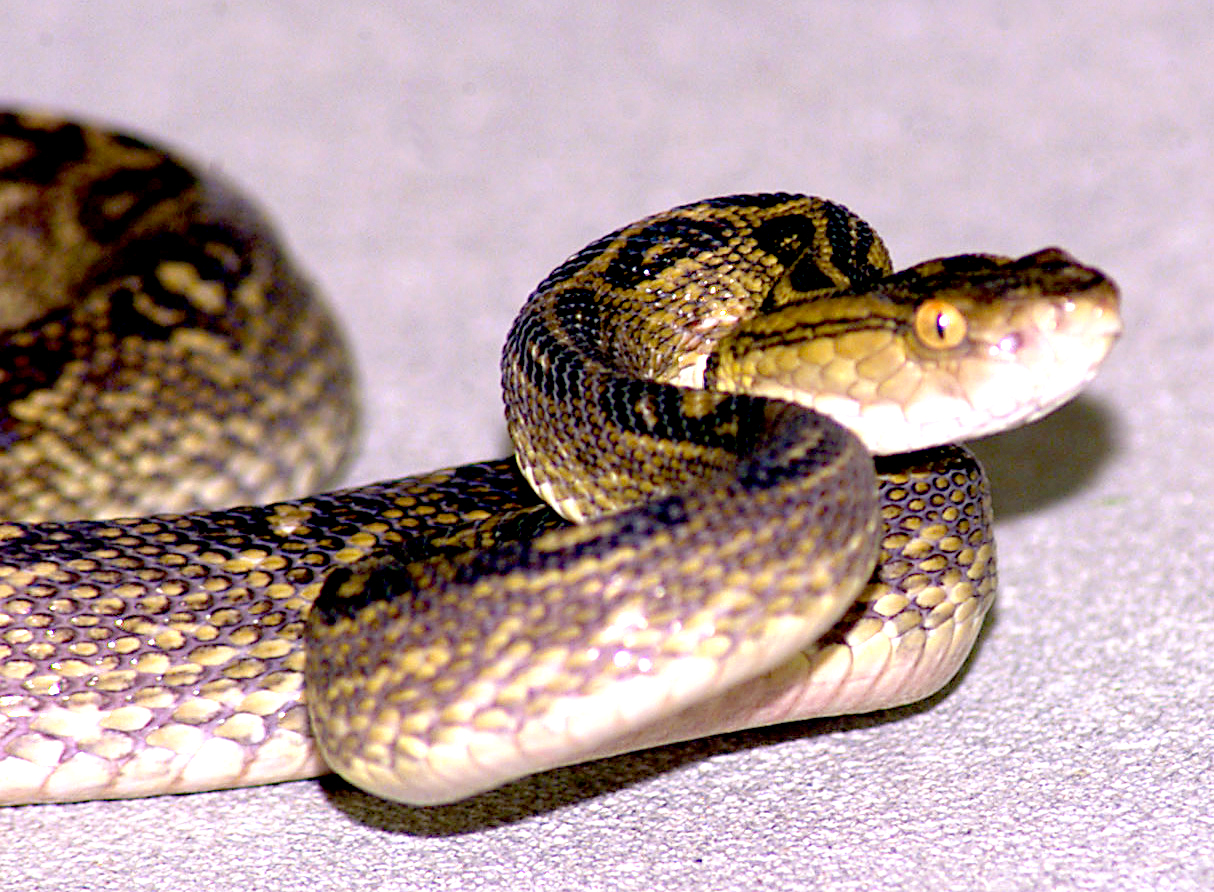
Habu snake (Trimeresurus flavoviridis)

Triflin is a toxin derived from snake venom. The toxin is produced in the gland of the Habu snake, Trimeresurus flavoviridis.

== Chemistry ==
Triflin is a cysteine-rich secretory protein, which means it belongs to the CRISP family. This is a group of single chain polypeptides found in various organisms. Triflin weighs 25 kDa and consists of 221 amino-acid residues. The first 163 residues of the N-terminal domain forms an α-β-α sandwich core. This domain is comparable with group 1 plant pathogenesis-related protein (PR-1). The C-terminal domain, has five disulfide bridges. This domain is responsible for the selectivity of the protein and consists of two subdomains: N-terminal subdomain (Cys 167 to Cys 179) and C-terminal subdomain (42 amino-acids residues). The N-terminal subdomain is connected with N-terminal domain through two main-chain hydrogen bonds between β11 and β2 and is thereby part of the PR-1 domain. The C-terminal subdomain is stabilized by three disulfide bridges and it is remarkable that this domain does not interact with either the PR-1 domain or the N-terminal sub-domain. The C-terminal subdomain consists of particles, including some hydrophobic residues that are exposed to the solvent. These hydrophobic residues might mediate the interaction with the target proteins and therefore receptor recognition.

There are some homologous toxins to Triflin with different percentages of amino-acid sequence similarity, such as Ablomin, Latisemin, Stecrip (88%), Helothermine (49%), Pseudechetoxin (62%), Pseudesin (61%). The snake venoms which belong to CRISP family seem to be homologous to each other, however there are differences in their protein targets.

== Target ==
Triflin reduces high potassium induced smooth muscle contraction, suggesting a blocking effect on L-type calcium channels.

== Treatment ==
One of the small serum proteins (SSP-2), a substance produced by Trimeresurus flavoviridis itself, has high affinity for Triflin, and may thus work as a defensive mechanism against accidental self-poisoning, suggesting a possible role for SSP-2 as an antidote to triflin.

== See also ==
- Other snake venom proteins in the CRISP family:
  - Piscivorin from the Eastern Cottonmouth
  - Latisemin from the Erabu snake
  - Ablomin from the Mamushi snake
  - Ophanin from the King Cobra
