= Ophanin =

Ophanin is a toxin found in the venom of the King Cobra (Ophiophagus hannah), which lives throughout South East Asia. This toxin belongs to the cysteine-rich secretory protein (CRISP) family. Ophanin weakly blocks the contraction of smooth muscles elicited by high potassium-induced depolarization, suggesting that it inhibits voltage-dependent calcium channels.

== Etymology ==
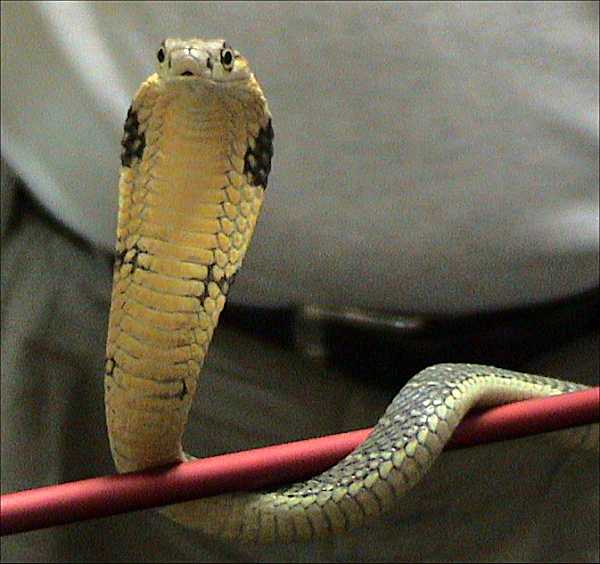
King Cobra (Ophiophagus hannah)

The toxin was named ophanin after the snake whose venom it is derived from, the King Cobra (Ophiophagus hannah).

== Sources ==
Ophanin is produced in the venom glands of the King Cobra (O. Hannah).

Although the venom has relatively low toxicity, this is compensated by the high amounts of it injected into the prey for each bite.

== Chemistry ==
=== Structure ===
Ophanin was successfully isolated from O. Hannah venom by gel filtration and cation-exchange chromatography. Its molecular weight is 25 kDa (from positions 19 – 239), which conforms to the molecular mass predicted from its cDNA sequences.

=== Homology ===
Ophanin is a cysteine-rich secretory protein and therefore belongs to the CRISP family. These proteins possess 16 strictly conserved cysteines and contain 8 disulfide bonds. Ten of the 16 cysteine residues are clustered at the C-terminal end of the protein. Ophanin belongs to the “long” CRISPs subgroup, which consists of the 9 CRISPs with the longest sequences. Snake venom CRISPs belonging to different subgroups act on different biological targets, contributing in this way to the diversity of damaging effects of snake venoms.

=== Family ===
The phylogenetic tree constructed from the nucleotide sequences of all known snake venom CRISPs shows that ophanin is more closely related to the Viperidae branch than the Elapidae branch even though O. Hannah belongs to the Elapidae snakes.

Ophanin, along with other specific snake toxins like triflin and ablomin, is also a helothermine-related venom protein (Helveprin) which was originally isolated from the skin of the Mexican beaded lizard.

== Target ==
Ophanin is a weak blocker of the high potassium-induced contraction of smooth muscles. Snake venom CRISP family proteins inhibit depolarization-induced smooth muscle contraction to different extents. Compared to the normal contraction of smooth muscle, ophanin is able to reduce their force of contractility to 84% ± 1%, which is less than most other CRISPs.

The differences between the inhibitory activity of CRISPs may be explained through sequence comparisons that suggest a site that may be critical for inhibition of channel activity. Phe189 and Glu186 are the most likely functional residues: strong blockers of smooth muscle contraction (ablomin, triflin, and latisemin) all have Phe189, and all blockers of smooth muscle contraction except ophanin have Glu186. The significance of this lack of the probable functional residues in ophanin has not yet been addressed. However, it is likely that the picture is more complex and other residues contribute to the inhibitory activity of CRISPs on smooth muscle contraction and some data supports this. For example, pseudecin, while also having Phe189, does not affect depolarization-induced contraction.

== Mode of action ==
There is no direct evidence of a particular mode of action of ophanin blocking depolarization-induced contractions of the smooth muscles. However, based on the hypothesis of Yamazaki and colleagues in regards to ablomin, another snake venom toxin from the CRISP family that also blocks depolarization-induced smooth muscle contraction, we can postulate a similar mechanism might be in place for ophanin.

Since ablomin only blocks contraction induced by depolarization, but not by caffeine, the effect of ablomin is likely to be caused by inhibition of voltage-gated ion channels. An activation of smooth muscle cells through caffeine activates ryanodine receptors of the sarcoplasmic reticulum, whereas an activation through high levels of extracellular potassium depolarizes the membrane (due to the change of the reversal potential for potassium towards more positive values) and would then activate voltage-gated calcium-ion channels leading to high levels of intracellular calcium ions. The intracellular calcium ion concentration correlates well with contraction force in the rat-tail artery. Thus, contraction following extracellular application of high-potassium solution depends on the influx of the extracellular calcium ions through voltage-gated calcium channels. Therefore, ablomin (and by extension ophanin) most likely targets voltage-gated calcium channels on smooth muscle.

== Toxicity ==
The LD_{50} of the venom in mice is ~1.2 to 3.5 mg/kg via intravenous injection. The LD50 of ophanin is not yet known.

== See also ==
- Other snake venom proteins in the CRISP family:
  - Piscivorin from the Eastern Cottonmouth
  - Triflin from the Habu snake
  - Ablomin from the Mamushi snake
  - Latisemin from the Erabu snake
