= Protobothrops dabieshanensis =

Scientific classification
- Kingdom: Animalia
- Phylum: Chordata
- Class: Reptilia
- Order: Squamata
- Suborder: Serpentes
- Family: Viperidae
- Genus: Protobothrops
- Species: P. dabieshanensis

Binomial name
- Protobothrops dabieshanensis Huang et al., 2012

Species of snake endemic to China

Protobothrops dabieshanensis, also known as the Dabie Mountains pit viper, is an endangered species of lance headed pit viper which is endemic to the Anhui Province of China. Like all pit vipers, P. dabieshanensis is venomous. It is thought to be in the top 30 most endangered viper species.

== Reproduction ==
The Dabie Mountains pitviper is oviparous.
