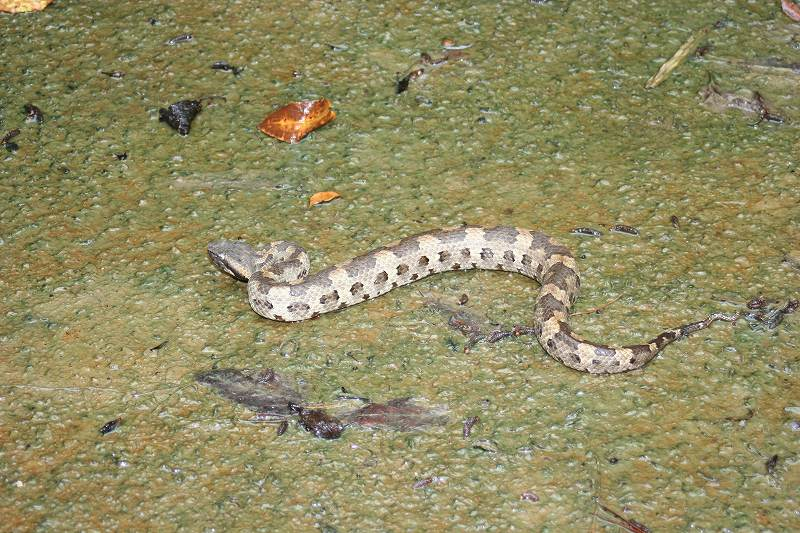

Conservation status
- Least Concern (IUCN 3.1)

Scientific classification
- Kingdom: Animalia
- Phylum: Chordata
- Class: Reptilia
- Order: Squamata
- Suborder: Serpentes
- Family: Viperidae
- Genus: Ovophis
- Species: O. okinavensis

Binomial name
- Ovophis okinavensis (Boulenger, 1892)

Synonyms
- Trimeresurus okinavensis Boulenger, 1892; Lachesis okinavensis – Boulenger, 1896; Ovophis okinavensis – Burger, 1981

= Ovophis okinavensis =

Species of snake

Ovophis okinavensis, commonly known as the hime habu (ヒメハブ), Ryukyu Island pit viper, and the Okinawan pitviper, is a pit viper species found in the Ryukyu Islands of Japan. No subspecies are currently recognized.

== Description ==
Adults are usually 30 to 80 cm (11¾–31½ inches) long. Body usually pale greenish-brown, or yellowish-olive (sometimes pale brown), with alternating, darker brownish or greenish dorsal blotches, each bordered with yellowish scales. Head large, triangular, distinct from neck, narrow dark postocular stripe.

Scalation includes: 23 or 21 rows of dorsal scales at midbody; 125–135 ventral scales; 36–55 paired subcaudal scales; and 8 (sometimes 7 or 9) supralabial scales.

The color pattern consists of a gray ground color overlaid with a series of dark gray of grayish-black crossbands. A ventrolateral pattern of black spots against a gray-white background is also present.

== Common names ==
The name Okinawa habu usually refers to Hon habu or simply habu (Protobothrops flavoviridis). The species is also known as kufah. This snake is sometimes referred to as Niibuyaa (ニーブヤー) in the Okinawan language. It is also called Mamushi, but only in Amami language, whereas Mamushi is the common name for the unrelated species Gloydius blomhoffii.

== Geographic range ==
The species is found in the Ryukyu Islands of Japan, including Okinawa and the Amami Islands. The type locality given is "Okinawa".

== Habitat ==
Ovophis okinavensis occurs in various habitats, including open woodland, forests, mountains, fields, in farming areas with nearby streams, ponds, and other water sources. It can also be found in human habitations

== Feeding ==
The hime habu hunts for rodents and other vertebrates in open areas, especially in sugar cane fields and, sometimes near human habitations.

== Reproduction ==
Both oviparous and ovoviviparous. Depending on environmental condition, females will either deposit their eggs, or retain them to incubate internally and give birth later to live young.

== Venom ==
The venom of Ovophis okinavensis, like that of most vipers, is mainly hemotoxin with cytotoxicity factors. People are bitten when they step on this sluggish snake at night, or when tending crops by day. Although venom from this snake is not life-threatening usually, people still should seek medical attention promptly if they are bitten. Because of its relatively weak venom, antivenom is not produced.
