= Protobothrops kaulbacki =

Conservation status
- Data Deficient (IUCN 3.1)

Scientific classification
- Kingdom: Animalia
- Phylum: Chordata
- Class: Reptilia
- Order: Squamata
- Suborder: Serpentes
- Family: Viperidae
- Genus: Protobothrops
- Species: P. kaulbacki

Binomial name
- Protobothrops kaulbacki (M.A. Smith, 1940)

Synonyms
- Trimeresurus kaulbacki M.A. Smith, 1940; P [rotobothrops]. kaulbacki — Kraus, Mink & W.M. Brown, 1996

Species of snake

Protobothrops kaulbacki, commonly known as Kaulback's lance-headed pit viper or Kaulback's lance-headed pit viper, is a pit viper species endemic to Asia. There are no subspecies that are recognized as being valid.

== Etymology ==
The specific name, kaulbacki, is in honor of British explorer Ronald Kaulback.

== Description ==
Adult males of P. kaulbacki may attain a total length of 134 cm (53 in), which includes a tail 22.5 cm (8.9 in) long. Females may grow longer: maximum total length 141 cm (56 in), tail 23 cm (9.1 in). Dorsally, it is green, with a vertebral series of dark angular spots, which may be joined to form a zigzag stripe. The top of the head is black with yellow stripes. Ventrally, except for the whitish throat area, it is gray with large squarish or crescent-shaped yellow spots. Scalation includes 25 rows of dorsal scales at midbody, 201–212 ventral scales, 66–78 subcaudal scales, and 8 supralabial scales of which the third is the largest.

== Geographic range ==
P. kaulbacki had originally been known only from the type locality, which is "Pangnamdim, north of the Triangle, Upper Burma" (Myanmar). In 2005 it was reported also from Tibet (China). It also occurs in Arunachal Pradesh (NE India).

== Habitat ==
The preferred natural habitats of P. kaulbacki are forest, shrubland, and grassland, at altitudes of 1,015–1,066 m (3,330–3,497 ft).

== Reproduction ==
P. kaulbacki is oviparous. The adult female lays a clutch of 6–32 eggs in a hole in the ground, and then remains with the eggs to guard them. Eggs measure 48–53 mm x 26–27 mm (about 2 in x 1 in). Each hatchling is 26–27 cm (about 10½ inches) in total length.

== Behavior ==
P. kaulbacki is terrestrial and partly arboreal.
