= Ablomin =

Ion channel toxin

Ablomin is a toxin present in the venom of the Japanese Mamushi snake, which blocks L-type voltage-gated calcium channels.

== Etymology ==
The protein ablomin is a component of the venom of the Japanese Mamushi snake, Gloydius blomhoffii. The term ‘ablomin’ is an acronym derived from Agkistrodon blomhoffi, an old name for this snake.

== Sources ==
The protein can be found in the venom of the Japanese Mamushi snake, a member of the Viperidae family.

== Chemistry ==
Ablomin is part of the Cystein-Rich Secretory Protein (CRISP) family. CRISPs comprise a particular group of snake venom proteins distributed among the venom of several families of snakes, such as elapids, colubrids and vipers.

The protein exists of 240 amino acids, coded by an mRNA of 1336 base pairs. Structurally, it is composed of three distinct regions: an N-terminal protein domain, a hinge region and a C-terminal cystein-rich domain. It has a molecular mass of 25 kDa.

Ablomin shows great sequence homology with triflin (83.7%) and latisemin (61.5%), two other snake venom components of the CRISP family, which also target voltage-dependent calcium channels. In addition, it shows partial homology with helothermine (52.8%), a venom protein of the Mexican beaded lizard; this protein, however, targets other ion channels than ablomin.

== Target ==
Ablomin reduces potassium-induced contraction of smooth muscles, suggesting that it blocks L-type voltage-gated calcium channels. Moreover, ablomin may slightly inhibit rod-type cyclic nucleotide-gated ion channels (CNGA1) channels.

== Toxicity ==
Ablomin affects high potassium-induced contraction of arterial smooth muscle in rat-tails in a concentration-dependent matter. Reduction of arterial smooth muscle contraction in a rat-tail results in vasodilation of the rat-tails artery, which may lead to hypothermia. Blocking other L-type voltage gated Ca^{2+} channels, for instance in the heart, may lead to arrhythmias and even cardiac arrest.

== See also ==
- Other snake venom proteins in the CRISP family:
  - Piscivorin from the Eastern Cottonmouth
  - Triflin from the Habu snake
  - Ophanin from the King Cobra
  - Latisemin from the Erabu snake
