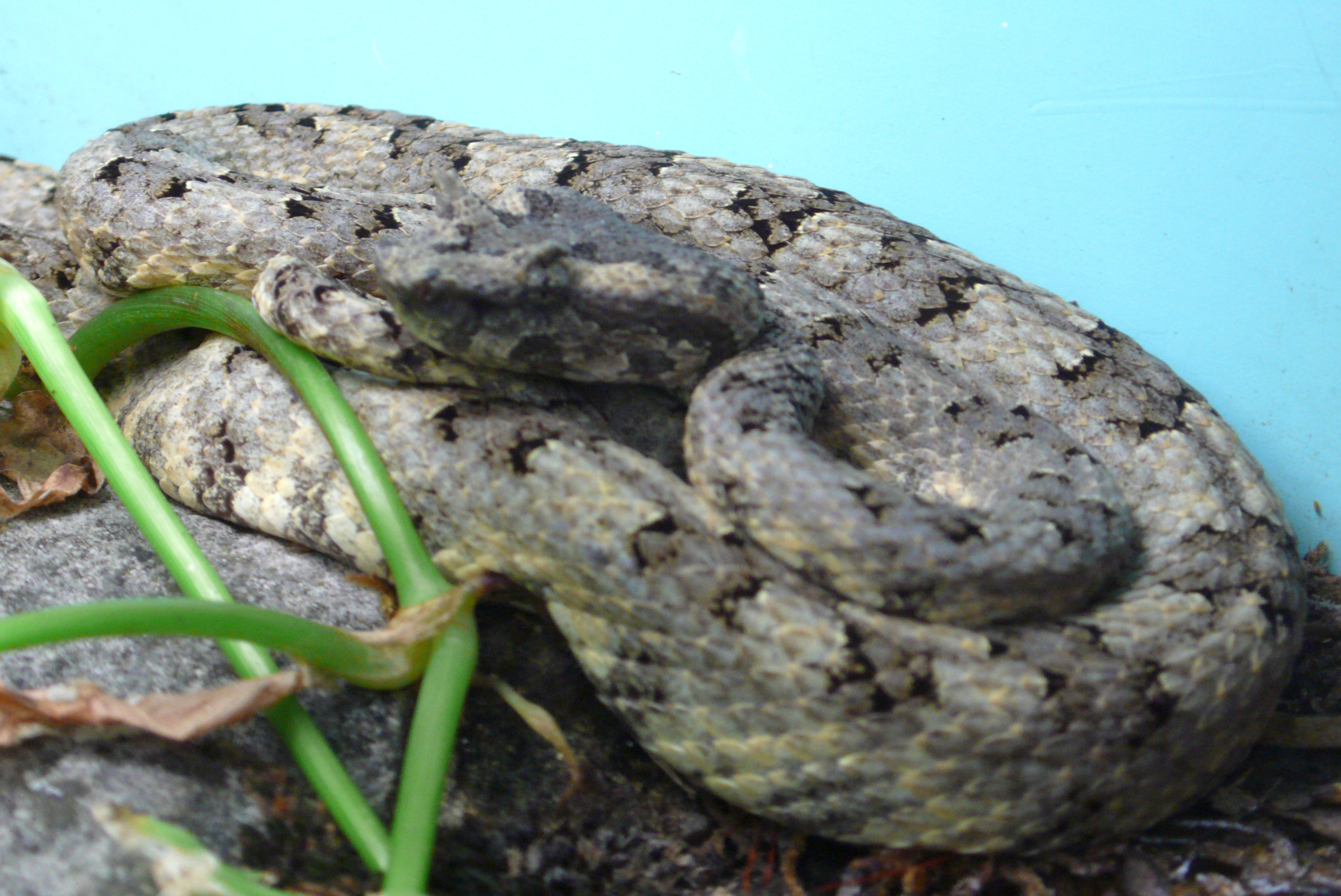

Conservation status
- Near Threatened (IUCN 3.1)

Scientific classification
- Kingdom: Animalia
- Phylum: Chordata
- Class: Reptilia
- Order: Squamata
- Suborder: Serpentes
- Family: Viperidae
- Genus: Protobothrops
- Species: P. cornutus

Binomial name
- Protobothrops cornutus (M. A. Smith, 1930)

Synonyms
- Trimeresurus cornutus M. A. Smith, 1930; Ceratrimeresurus shenlii Liang & Liu, 2003; Protobothrops cornutus – Herrmann et al., 2004

= Protobothrops cornutus =

Species of snake

Protobothrops cornutus, commonly known as the horned pit viper or Fan-Si-Pan horned pit viper, is a pit viper species found in northern and central Vietnam and in southern China (Guangdong). No subspecies are currently recognized.

== Description ==
Its maximum length is usually around 60-90cm. It has a long body, with a flat oblong trangular head differentiated from the body, with small scales. Its nostril scale is also triangular. It was found to exhibit the largest attack acceleration among snakes, about 18g.

== Geographic range ==
The type locality given is "Fan-si-pan mountains, Tonkin, Indo-China" (=Mount Fansipan). It is currently known from several provinces in Vietnam (Lao Cai Province, Ha Giang Province, Quang Binh Province, Hue City, Lang Son Province). The only Chinese record is from Ruyuan Yao Autonomous County in northern Guangdong and was originally described as a new species, Ceratrimeresurus shenlii.

== Habitat ==
It occurs in evergreen forest on both karst and granitic outcrops at elevations of 250–2,000 m (820–6,560 ft) above sea level.

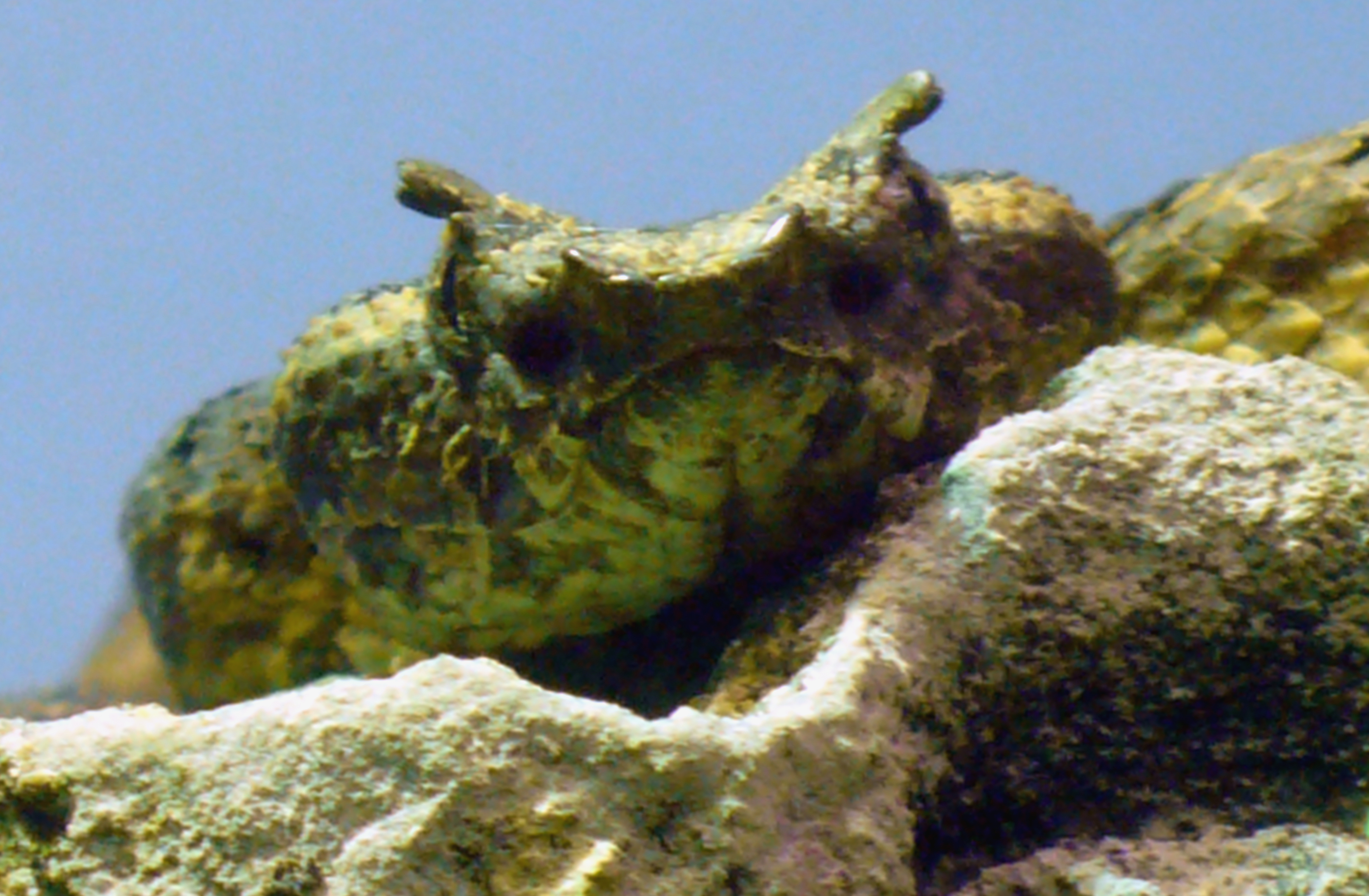
Close-up of head, showing "horns" to which the specific name, cornutus, refers.

== Taxonomy ==
Herrmann et al. (2004) moved this species to the genus Protobothrops based on external and hemipenal morphology, as well as molecular data.
