= CRISP1 =

Protein-coding gene in the species Homo sapiens

Identifiers
- Aliases: CRISP1, AEGL1, ARP, CRISP-1, HSCRISP1D, HSCRISP1G, HUMARP, HEL-S-57, cysteine rich secretory protein 1
- External IDs: OMIM: 601193; MGI: 1925331; HomoloGene: 81683; GeneCards: CRISP1; OMA:CRISP1 - orthologs

Gene location (Human)
| Chr. | Chromosome 6 (human) |
| Band | 6p12.3 | Start | 49,834,257 bp |
| Band | 6p12.3 | End | 49,877,096 bp |

Gene location (Mouse)
| Chr. | Chromosome 1 (mouse) |
| Band | 1|1 A3 | Start | 18,185,415 bp |
| Band | 1|1 A3 | End | 18,216,126 bp |
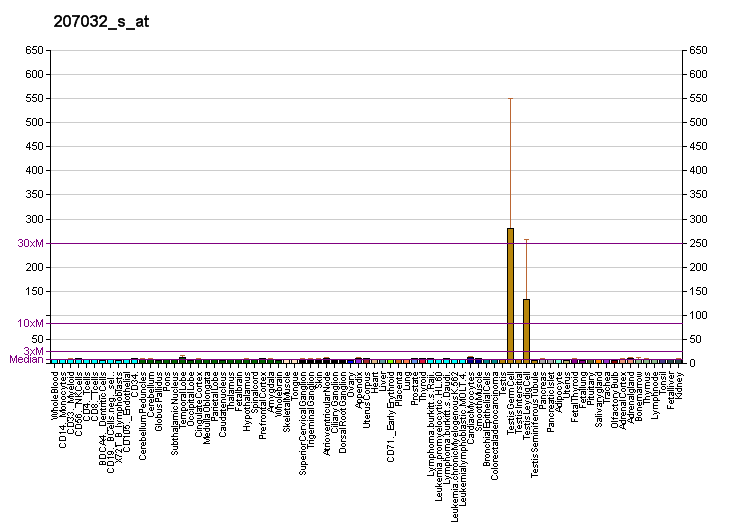

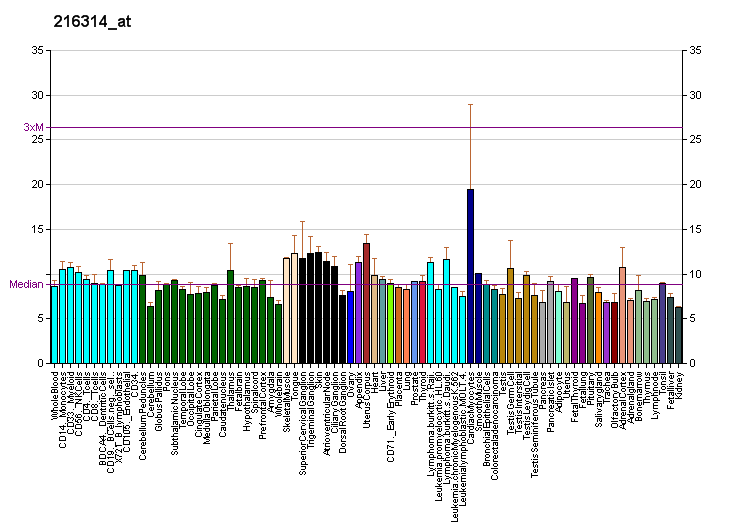
RNA expression pattern
| Bgee | Human / Mouse (ortholog); Top expressed in: corpus epididymis; tail of epididymis; sperm; seminal vesicula; caput epididymis; left testis; right testis; buccal mucosa cell; endometrium; head / Top expressed in: spermatid; white adipose tissue; dorsal striatum; nucleus of brain; male reproductive system; telencephalic nucleus; testicle; hypothalamus; brain stem; midbrain tegmentum; More reference expression data |
| BioGPS | More reference expression data |
Gene ontology
| Molecular function | calcium channel regulator activity |
| Cellular component | extracellular region; nucleus; extracellular space |
| Biological process | fusion of sperm to egg plasma membrane involved in single fertilization; regulation of acrosome reaction; binding of sperm to zona pellucida; regulation of molecular function |
Sources:Amigo / QuickGO
Orthologs
| Species | Human | Mouse |
| Entrez | 167 | 78081 |
| Ensembl | ENSG00000124812 | ENSMUSG00000025774 |
| UniProt | P54107 | n/a |
| RefSeq (mRNA) | NM_001131; NM_001205220; NM_170609 | NM_030033; NM_001347047; NM_001347048 |
| RefSeq (protein) | NP_001122; NP_001192149; NP_733758 | n/a |
| Location (UCSC) | Chr 6: 49.83 – 49.88 Mb | Chr 1: 18.19 – 18.22 Mb |
| PubMed search |
- Wikidata
| View/Edit Human | View/Edit Mouse |

Cysteine-rich secretory protein 1 is a cysteine-rich secretory protein that in humans is encoded by the CRISP1 gene.

Fertilization consists of a sequence of specific cell-cell interactions culminating in the fusion of the sperm and egg plasma membranes. Recognition, binding, and fusion occur through the interaction of complementary molecules that are localized to specific domains of the sperm and egg plasma membranes. In the sperm, the postacrosomal region or equatorial segment is involved in sperm-egg plasma membrane fusion. The protein encoded by this gene is a member of the cysteine-rich secretory protein (CRISP) family. This protein is expressed in the epididymis, is secreted into the epididymal lumen, and binds to the postacrosomal region of the sperm head where it plays a role at fertilization in sperm-egg fusion through complementary sites localized on the egg surface. Two isoforms are encoded by transcript variants of this gene.
