= CRISP2 =

Protein-coding gene in the species Homo sapiens

Available structures
PDB	Ortholog search: PDBe RCSB
PDB	List of PDB id codes 2CQ7

Identifiers
- Aliases: CRISP2, CRISP-2, CT36, GAPDL5, TPX1, TSP1, cysteine rich secretory protein 2
- External IDs: OMIM: 187430; MGI: 98815; HomoloGene: 37756; GeneCards: CRISP2; OMA:CRISP2 - orthologs

Gene location (Human)
Chr.	Chromosome 6 (human)
Band	6p12.3	Start	49,692,358 bp
Band	6p12.3	End	49,713,590 bp

Gene location (Mouse)
Chr.	Chromosome 17 (mouse)
Band	17 B2|17 19.54 cM	Start	41,074,911 bp
Band	17 B2|17 19.54 cM	End	41,117,894 bp
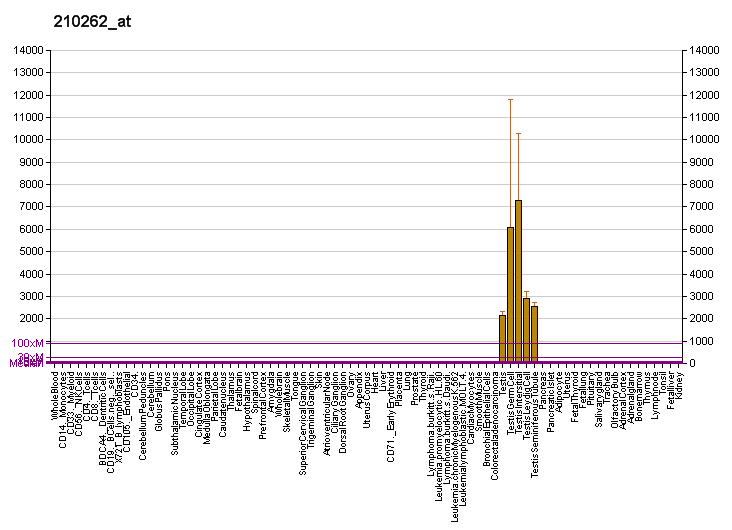
RNA expression pattern
Bgee	Human / Mouse (ortholog); Top expressed in: sperm; left testis; right testis; right uterine tube; pancreatic ductal cell; testicle; bronchial epithelial cell; minor salivary glands; caput epididymis; gallbladder / Top expressed in: seminiferous tubule; spermatid; spermatocyte; embryo; epithelium of lens; muscle tissue; white adipose tissue; islet of Langerhans; striated muscle tissue; skeletal muscle tissue; More reference expression data
BioGPS	More reference expression data
Orthologs
Species	Human	Mouse
Entrez	7180	22024
Ensembl	ENSG00000124490	ENSMUSG00000023930
UniProt	P16562	P16563
RefSeq (mRNA)	NM_001142407; NM_001142408; NM_001142417; NM_001142435; NM_001261822 NM_003296	NM_001204071; NM_009420
RefSeq (protein)	NP_001135879; NP_001135880; NP_001135889; NP_001135907; NP_001248751 NP_003287	NP_001191000; NP_033446
Location (UCSC)	Chr 6: 49.69 – 49.71 Mb	Chr 17: 41.07 – 41.12 Mb
PubMed search
- Wikidata
View/Edit Human	View/Edit Mouse

Cysteine-rich secretory protein 2 is a cysteine-rich secretory protein that in humans is encoded by the CRISP2 gene.
