= CRISP3 =

Protein-coding gene in the species Homo sapiens

Identifiers
- Aliases: CRISP3, Aeg2, CRISP-3, CRS3, SGP28, dJ442L6.3, cysteine rich secretory protein 3
- External IDs: OMIM: 618062; HomoloGene: 136801; GeneCards: CRISP3; OMA:CRISP3 - orthologs

Gene location (Human)
Chr.	Chromosome 6 (human)
Band	6p12.3	Start	49,727,376 bp
Band	6p12.3	End	49,744,437 bp
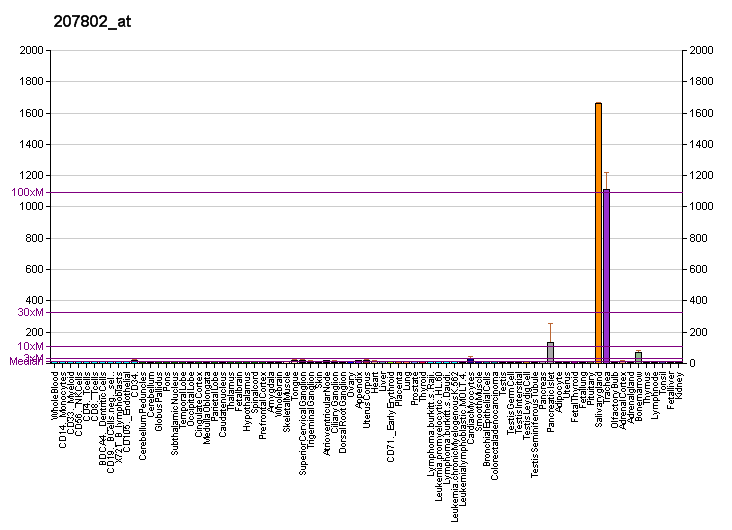
RNA expression pattern
Bgee	Human / Mouse (ortholog); Top expressed in: pancreatic ductal cell; right uterine tube; olfactory zone of nasal mucosa; trabecular bone; mucosa of pharynx; bone marrow; minor salivary glands; seminal vesicula; oral cavity; bone marrow cells / n/a; More reference expression data
BioGPS	More reference expression data
Gene ontology
Molecular function	molecular function
Cellular component	specific granule; extracellular exosome; extracellular region; extracellular space; specific granule lumen; tertiary granule lumen; extracellular matrix; membrane; integral component of membrane
Biological process	defense response; innate immune response; neutrophil degranulation
Sources:Amigo / QuickGO
Orthologs
Species	Human	Mouse
Entrez	10321	n/a
Ensembl	ENSG00000096006	n/a
UniProt	P54108	n/a
RefSeq (mRNA)	NM_006061; NM_001190986; NM_001368123	n/a
RefSeq (protein)	NP_001177915; NP_006052; NP_001355052	n/a
Location (UCSC)	Chr 6: 49.73 – 49.74 Mb	n/a
PubMed search		n/a
- Wikidata
View/Edit Human

Cysteine-rich secretory protein 3 is a cysteine-rich secretory protein that in humans is encoded by the CRISP3 gene.
