= Protobothrops xiangchengensis =

Conservation status
- Least Concern (IUCN 3.1)

Scientific classification
- Kingdom: Animalia
- Phylum: Chordata
- Class: Reptilia
- Order: Squamata
- Suborder: Serpentes
- Family: Viperidae
- Genus: Protobothrops
- Species: P. xiangchengensis

Binomial name
- Protobothrops xiangchengensis (Zhao, Jiang & Huang, 1978)
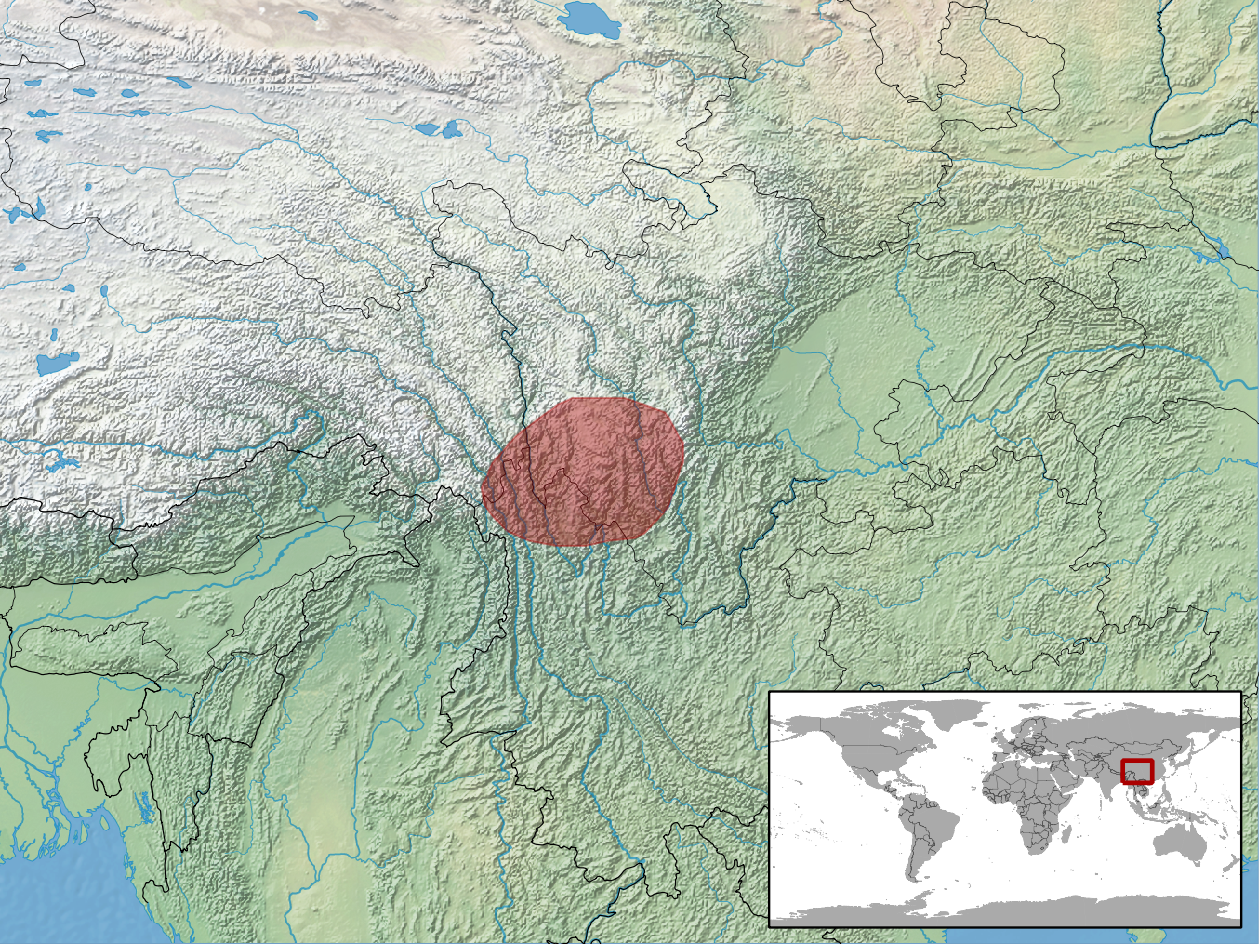

Synonyms
- Trimeresurus Xiangchengensis Zhao, 1978; Trimeresurus xiangchengensis Zhao, Jiang & Huang, 1978; Trimeresurus xiangchengensis – Zhao, 1979; Protobothrops xiangchengensis – Gumprecht et al., 2004, Protobothrops xiangchengensis – Malhotra & Thorpe, 2004

Species of snake

Protobothrops xiangchengensis, commonly known as the Szechwan pit viper, Kham Plateau pit viper, or Sichuan lancehead, is a pit viper species endemic to the Hengduan Mountains in south-central China. No subspecies are currently recognized.

== Taxonomy ==
Originally described as a member of the genus Trimeresurus, it was later reassigned to Protobothrops.

== Description ==
Scalation includes 25 (23, 24) rows of dorsal scales at midbody, 175–194/181–194 ventral scales in males/females, 54–66/44–62 subcaudal scales and 7–8 (9 or 10) supralabial scales.

== Geographic range ==
Protobothrops xiangchengensis is endemic to the Hengduan Mountains in the provinces of Yunnan and western Sichuan, China. According to David & Tong (1997), the type locality given is "Sichuan Province, Xiangcheng, altitude 3100 m [10,200 ft]".

== See also ==
- Snakebite
