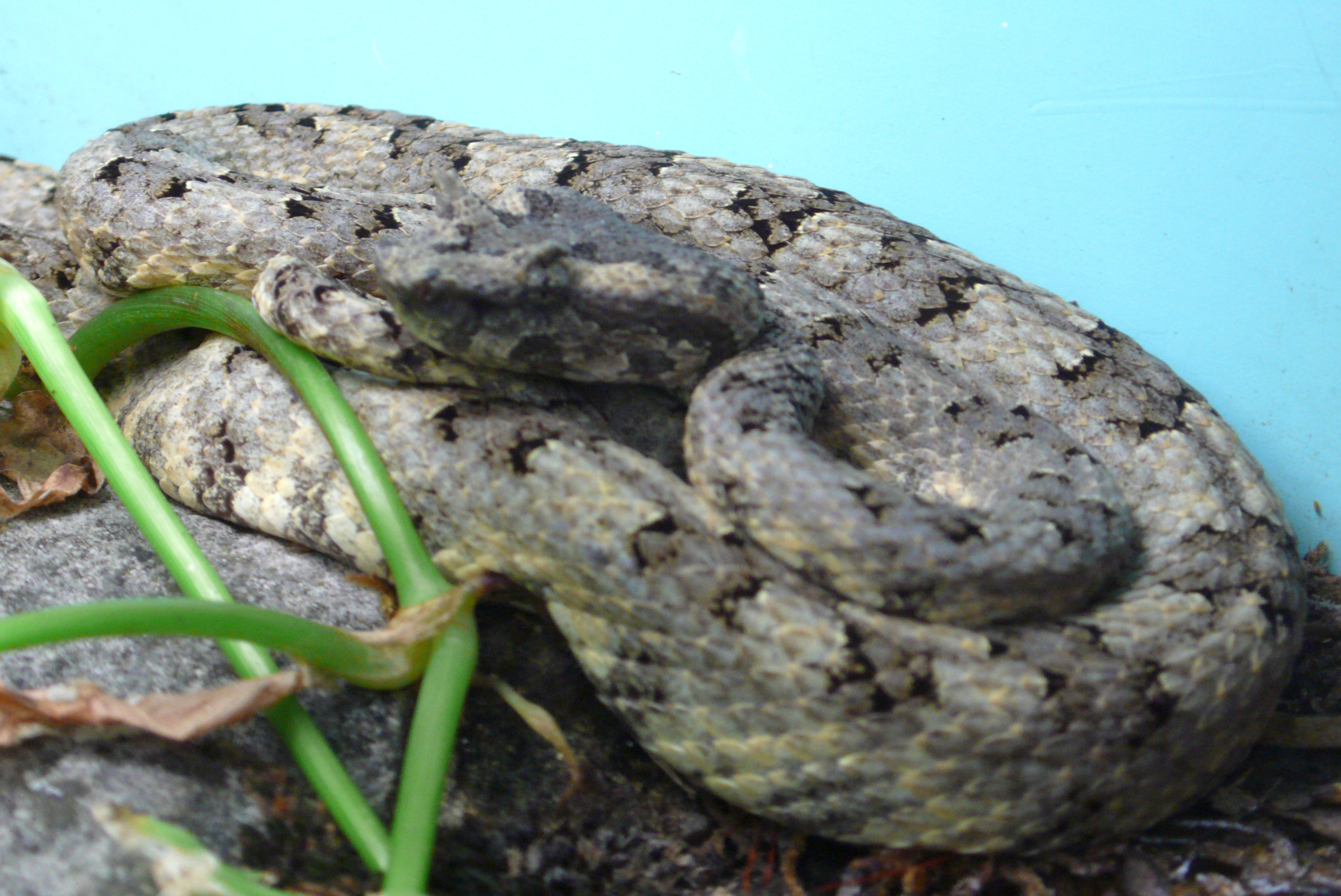
- Protobothrops cornutus
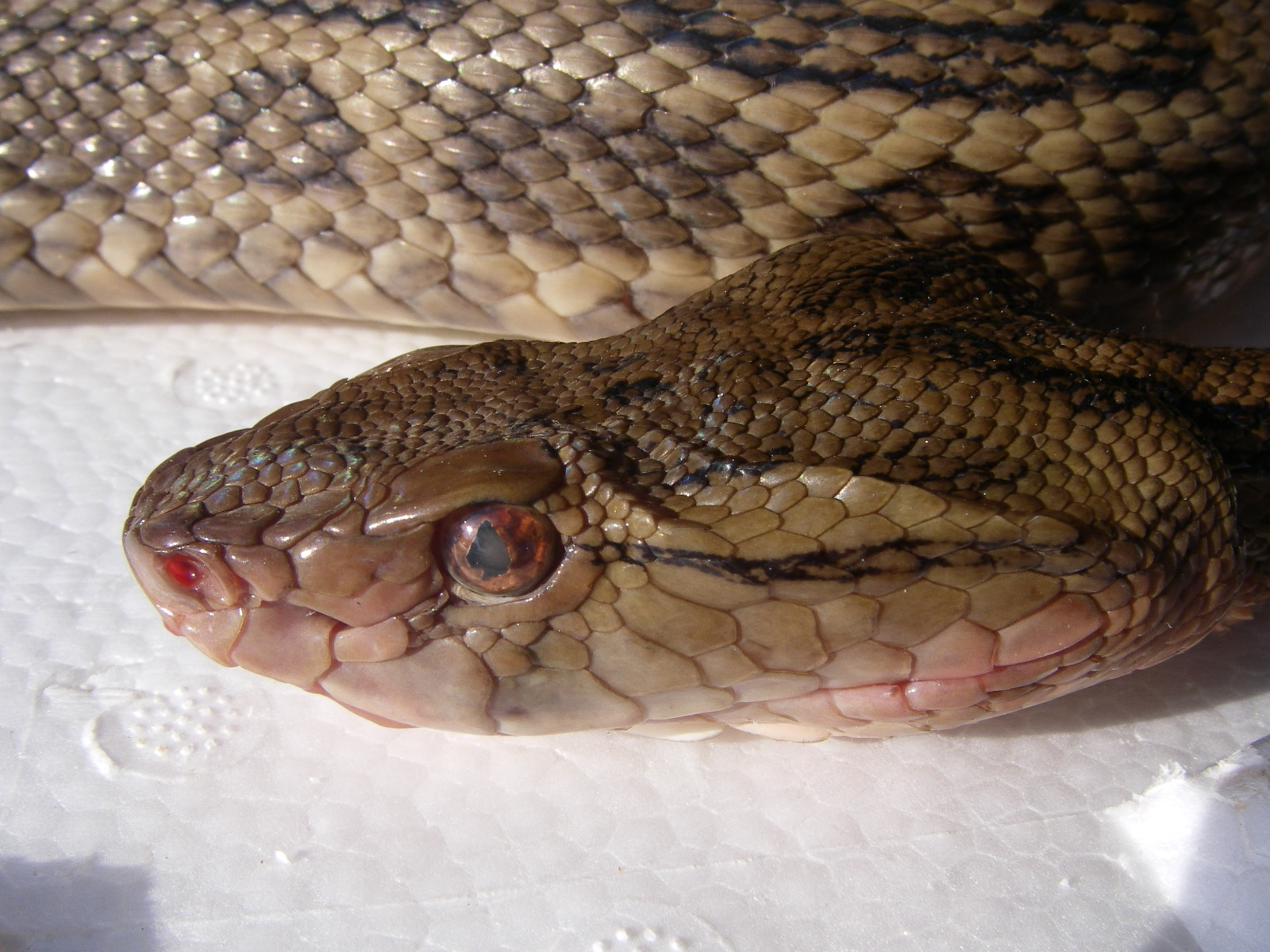

Scientific classification
- Kingdom: Animalia
- Phylum: Chordata
- Class: Reptilia
- Order: Squamata
- Suborder: Serpentes
- Family: Viperidae
- Subfamily: Crotalinae
- Genus: Protobothrops; Hoge & Romano-Hoge, 1983

Type species
- Protobothrops flavoviridis Hallowell, 1861

= Protobothrops =

Genus of snakes

Protobothrops is a genus of pit vipers found in Asia. It is also known as the lance headed pit vipers.

The venom of Protobothrops can be diverse and unique across individual organisms of the same and differing species and has demonstrated the ability to evolve in an accelerated manner. One possible explanation for these traits is that the habitat in which Protobothrops reside contains a large variety of prey which may have prompted the diversification of the venom related genes.

== Species ==
Image	Scientific name	Distribution
	Protobothrops cornutus (M.A. Smith, 1930)	Vietnam and Southern China.
	Protobothrops dabieshanensis Huang, T. Pan, Han, L. Zhang, Hou, Yu, Zheng & B. Zhang, 2012	China
	Protobothrops elegans (Gray, 1849)	Ryukyu Islands, specifically the Yaeyama Islands.
	Protobothrops flavirostris Grassby-Lewis, Brakels, Maury, Sitthivong, Frohlich, Pawangkhanant, Idiiatullina, Nguyen & Poyarkov, 2025	Vang Vieng District, Vientiane Province, Laos
	Protobothrops flavoviridis (Hallowell, 1861)	Ryukyu Islands, including Okinawa and the Amami Islands.
	Protobothrops himalayanus H. Pan, Chettri, D. Yang, K. Jiang, K. Wang, L. Zhang & Vogel, 2013	China (southern Tibet), Nepal, Bhutan, India (Sikkim)
	Protobothrops jerdonii (Günther, 1875)	India, Nepal, Myanmar, China, and Vietnam.
	Protobothrops kaulbacki (M.A. Smith, 1940)	Myanmar, China
	Protobothrops kelomohy Sumontha, Vasaruchapong, Chomngam, Suntrarachun, Pawangkhanant, Sompan, Smit, Kunya & Chanhome, 2020	Northern Thailand
	Protobothrops mangshanensis (Zhao, 1990)	China (Guangdong, Hunan)
	Protobothrops maolanensis J. Yang, Orlov & Y. Wang, 2011	China (Guizhou)
	Protobothrops mucrosquamatus (Cantor, 1839)	India (Assam and Mizoram) and Bangladesh, to Myanmar, China (including Hainan, and as far north as Gansu and as far east as Zhejiang), Laos, northern and central Vietnam, also found in northern Thailand as well as in Taiwan
	Protobothrops sieversorum (Ziegler, Herrmann, David, Orlov & Pauwels, 2000)	Vietnam
	Protobothrops tokarensis (Nagai, 1928)	Kagoshima, Kyushu and the Ryukyu Islands
	Protobothrops trungkhanhensis Orlov, Ryabov & Nguyen, 2009	Vietnam, China
	Protobothrops xiangchengensis (Zhao, Y. Jiang & Huang, 1979)	China (Yunnan, Sichuan)

Nota bene: A binomial authority in parentheses indicates that the species was originally described in a genus other than Protobothrops.
