= Ronald Kaulback =

Ronald John Henry Kaulback (23 July 1909 – 2 October 1995) was a British explorer, botanist and geographer. He was the son of Colonel H. A. Kaulback and had a younger brother Roy (known as Bill). After studying at the University of Cambridge and learning surveying at the Royal Geographical Society he accompanied Frank Kingdon-Ward on an expedition to Tibet, setting sail from Marseille on 29 January 1933 and arriving in Bombay on 15 February. For political reasons Kaulback was forbidden to continue on the second part of that journey. So he, Brooks Carrington and some others set out on a route by Fort Hertz and Burma which included crossing the Diphuk La and after travelling at the worst season reached Fort Hertz. He travelled in Burma, Nepal and Tibet. His account of his journey, Tibetan Trek, was published by Hodder & Stoughton in 1934; in 1937 the 3rd edition was published.

Kaulback wrote in defence of the possible existence of the Yeti, having seen what he took to be large footprints while attempting to locate the source of the Salween River.

== Legacy ==
Kaulbach is commemorated in the scientific name of a species of Asian pit viper, Protobothrops kaulbacki.
