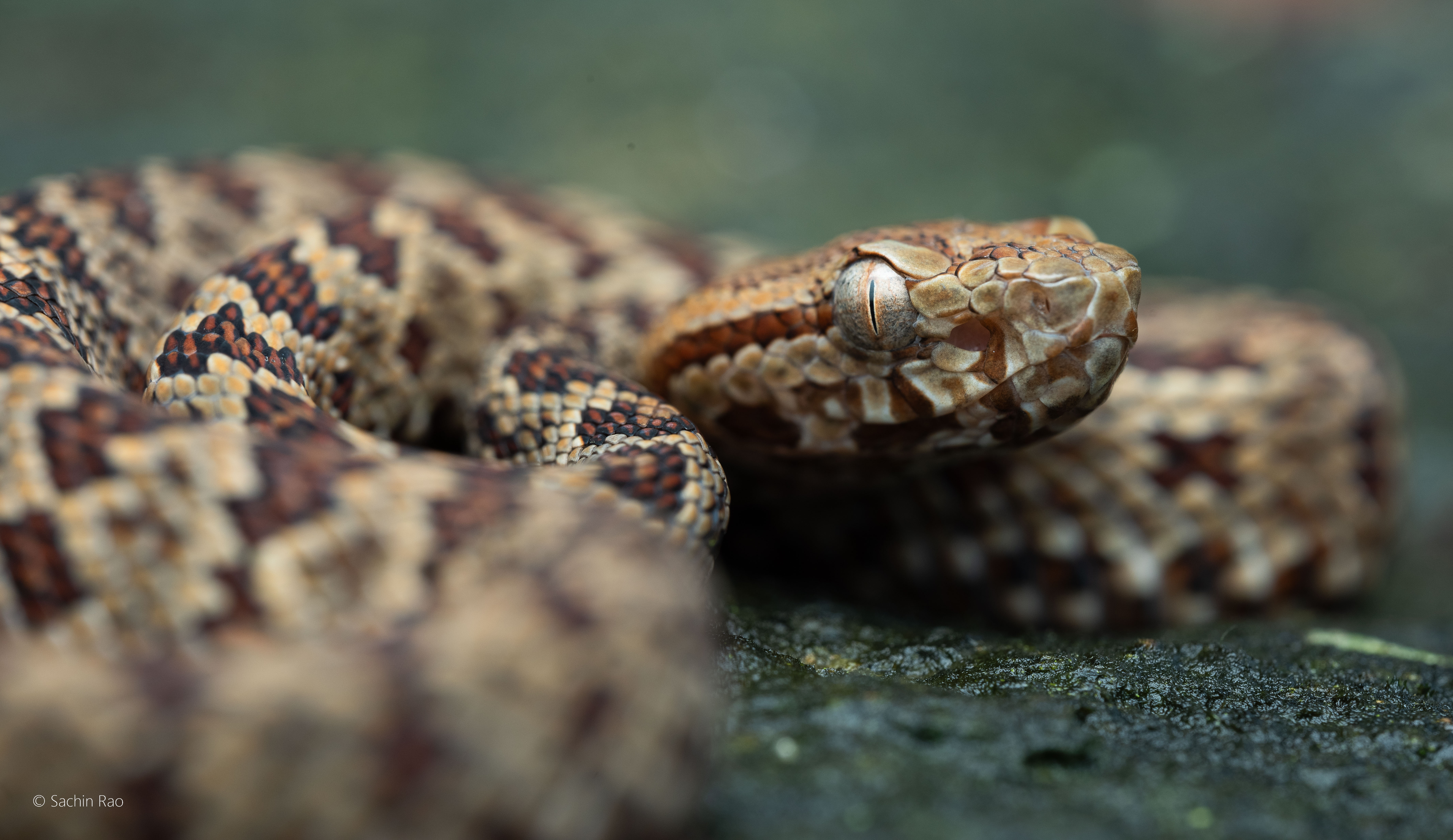

Scientific classification
- Kingdom: Animalia
- Phylum: Chordata
- Class: Reptilia
- Order: Squamata
- Suborder: Serpentes
- Family: Viperidae
- Genus: Protobothrops
- Species: P. himalayanus

Binomial name
- Protobothrops himalayanus Pan et al., 2013

= Protobothrops himalayanus =

Species of snake endemic to Asia

Protobothrops himalayanus is a rare species of lance headed pit viper which is endemic to Asia. Like all pit vipers, P. himalayanus is venomous.

== Description ==
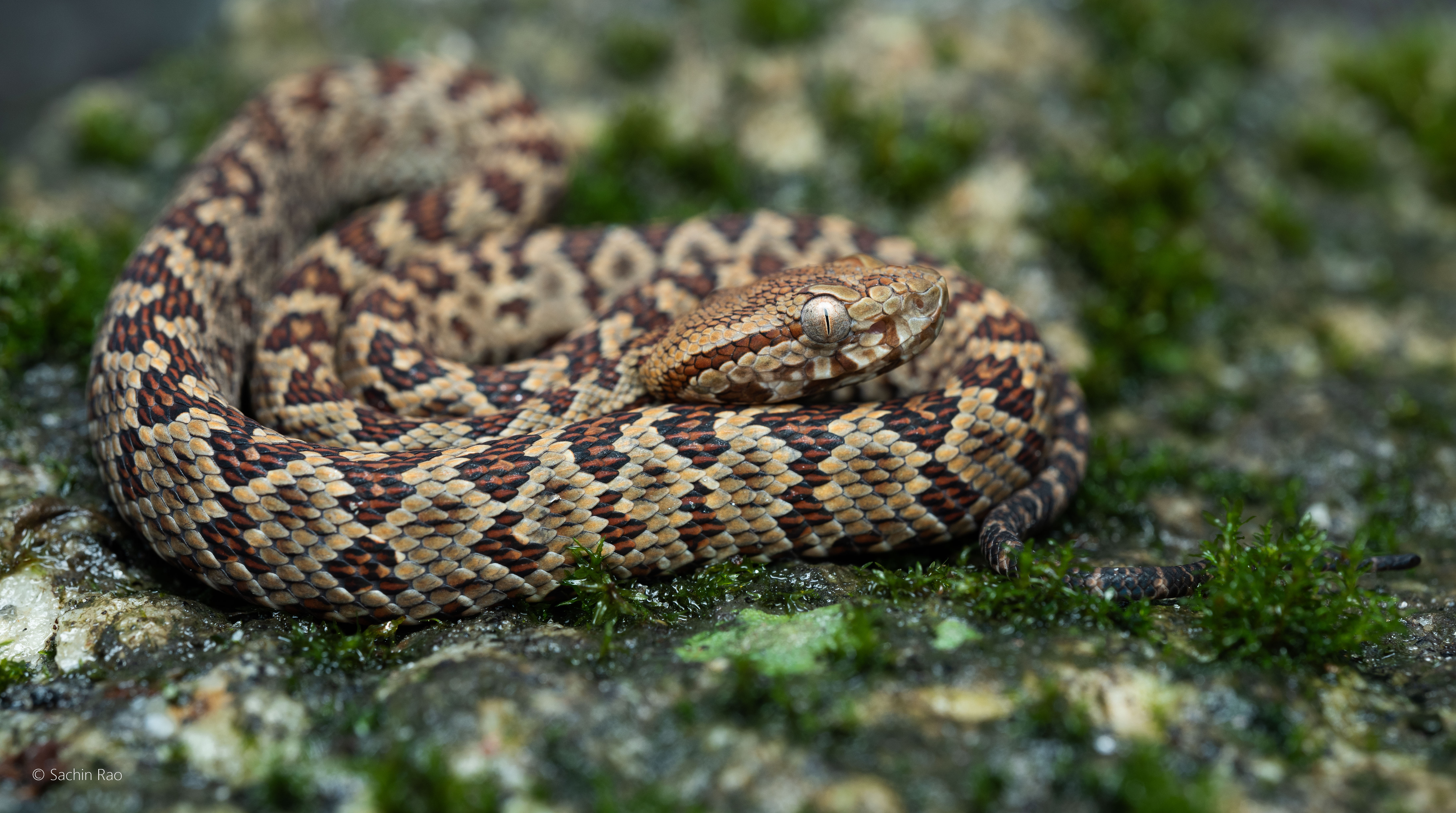
Protobothrops himalayanus

Protobothrops himalayanus is a large, thin and cylindrical snake. The topside of its head is dark brown with red-brown streaks by its eyes. The topside of its body and tail are olive with black and brown band markings. Its eyes are varying shades of brown.
