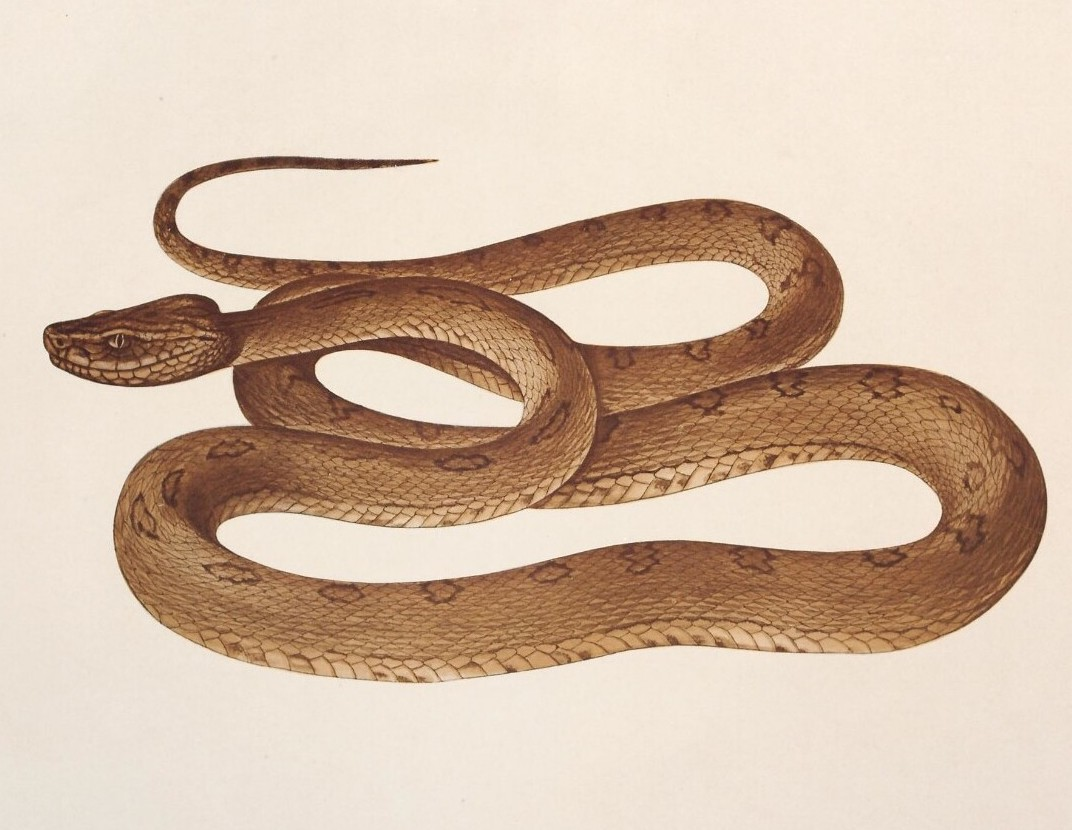

Scientific classification
- Kingdom: Animalia
- Phylum: Chordata
- Class: Reptilia
- Order: Squamata
- Suborder: Serpentes
- Family: Viperidae
- Genus: Protobothrops
- Species: P. tokarensis

Binomial name
- Protobothrops tokarensis Nagai, 1928

Synonyms
- Trimeresurus tokarensis Nagai, 1928; Trimeresurus flavoviridis tokarensis – Maki, 1931; Protobothrops tokarensis – Welch, 1988; Trimeresurus tokarensis – Golay et al., 1993; P[rotobothrops]. tokarensis – Kraus, Mink & Brown, 1996

= Tokara habu =

Species of snake

The Tokara habu (Protobothrops tokarensis) is a pit viper species endemic to the Tokara Islands of Japan. No subspecies are currently recognized.

== Description ==
Scalation includes 31 (31-33) rows of dorsal scales at midbody, 199-210 ventral scales, 72-84 subcaudal scales, and 8 (7-9) supralabial scales.

== Geographic range ==
Found in Japan on the islands of Takara-jima and Kotakara-jima. According to Golay et al. (1993), the type locality is "Takara-jima, province of Kagoshima, Ryukyu Islands".

== See also ==
- Snakebite
