= Piscivorin =

Piscivorin is a component of snake venom secreted by the Eastern Cottonmouth (Agkistrodon piscivorus piscivorus). It is a member of the cysteine-rich secretory protein (CRISP) family, which blocks voltage-dependent calcium channels.

== Etymology ==
The name of piscivorin comes from the snake species name piscivorus, which is derived from the Latin words pisces and vorare, meaning 'fish' and 'to devour' respectively.

== Sources ==
Piscivorin is produced in the venom glands of the Eastern Cottonmouth snake (Agkistrodon piscivorus piscivorus), which populates the Eastern United States. Typically, crude venom from the Eastern Cottonmouth contains approximately 1.25% of piscivorin.

== Biochemistry ==
Piscivorin belongs to the cysteine-rich secretory protein (CRISP) family, which are secreted as single-chain proteins with molecular masses between 20 and 30 kDa. They display significant amino acid sequence homology. Sixteen cysteine residues, forming 8 disulfide bonds, are strictly conserved in CRISPs. Ten of these cysteine residues are clustered into the C-terminal part of the protein.

The molecular mass of piscivorin is 24.842 kDa. The nucleotide sequence of piscivorin cDNA spans 1323 bp, containing an open reading frame of 240 codons.

Piscivorin has the following amino acid sequence.

10	20	30	40	50	60
MIAFIVLPIL	AAVLQQSSGS	VDFDSESPRK	PEIQNQIVDL	HNSLRRSVNP	TASNMLKMEW
70	80	90	100	110	120
YPEAAANAER	WAYRCIESHS	PRNSRVLGGI	KCGENIYMSS	IPIKWTEIIH	AWHGENKNFK
130	140	150	160	170	180
YGIGADPPNA	VIGHFTQIVW	YKSYLVGCAA	AYCPSSEYSY	FYVCQYCPAG	NIIGKIATPY
190	200	210	220	230	240
KSGPPCGDCP	SACVNGLCTN	PCTKEDKYTN	CKSLVQQYGC	QDKQMQSECS	AICFCQNKII

== Target and mode of action ==
Piscivorin reduces high potassium-evoked smooth muscle contraction, but does not inhibit caffeine-stimulated contraction of smooth muscle. Since caffeine normally causes contraction through the release of Ca^{2+} from the sarcoplasmic reticulum, this differential effect indicates that piscivorin is an L-type calcium channel blocker. At a concentration of 1 μM, its effect on depolarization-induced smooth muscle contraction is weaker than of the related CRISP family toxins ablomin, triflin or latisemin. A sequence comparison of piscivorin and other CRISP family proteins suggests that the Glu186 residue is the crucial site for the blocking of the calcium channels.

Unlike some other CRISP family proteins, piscivorin does not block cyclic nucleotide-gated channels.
