= Protobothrops kelomohy =

Scientific classification
- Kingdom: Animalia
- Phylum: Chordata
- Class: Reptilia
- Order: Squamata
- Suborder: Serpentes
- Family: Viperidae
- Genus: Protobothrops
- Species: P. kelomohy

Binomial name
- Protobothrops kelomohy Sumontha, Vasaruchapong, Chomngam, Suntrarachun, Pawangkhanant, Sompan, Smits, Kunya & Chanhome, 2020

Species of snake

Protobothrops kelomohy, the Omkoi lance-headed pit viper, is a species of venomous snake in the genus Protobothrops found in Thailand.

== Etymology ==
The specific name, kelomohy, is derived from the Karen language, meaning "snake of Omkoi", referring to the region in Thailand where this species was discovered.

== Description ==
The Omkoi lance-headed pit viper is characterized by its relatively large body size, with males reaching up to 110 cm and females up to 132 cm in length. The body pattern consists of a brown or grayish background, overlaid with dark reddish-brown transverse blotches edged in black, which may fuse to form a median zigzag line on the dorsum. The head features a typical lance-pattern with three bold vertical facial stripes.

== Geographical range ==
The Omkoi lance-headed pit viper is endemic to the Omkoi district in Chiang Mai province, Thailand. This species inhabits rocky and forested areas, often found on the ground but also capable of climbing rocky surfaces due to its long, slender body and keeled scales.
