= Hibifolin =

Names
- IUPAC name 3,3′,4′,5,7-Pentahydroxy-4-oxoflav-2-en-8-yl β-D-glucopyranosiduronic acid
- Systematic IUPAC name (2S,3S,4S,5R,6S)-6-{[2-(3,4-Dihydroxyphenyl)-3,5,7-trihydroxy-4-oxo-4H-1-benzopyran-8-yl]oxy}-3,4,5-trihydroxyoxane-2-carboxylic acid

Identifiers
CAS Number	55366-56-8
3D model (JSmol)	Interactive image
ChemSpider	4590330
PubChem CID	5490334
UNII	JR6MS62GTB
CompTox Dashboard (EPA)	DTXSID00203913
- InChI: InChI=1S/C21H18O14/c22-6-2-1-5(3-7(6)23)16-13(28)11(26)10-8(24)4-9(25)17(18(10)33-16)34-21-15(30)12(27)14(29)19(35-21)20(31)32/h1-4,12,14-15,19,21-25,27-30H,(H,31,32)/t12-,14-,15+,19-,21+/m0/s1 Key: KHVMAMXQPVHXTJ-ORYXKJSJSA-N; InChI=1/C21H18O14/c22-6-2-1-5(3-7(6)23)16-13(28)11(26)10-8(24)4-9(25)17(18(10)33-16)34-21-15(30)12(27)14(29)19(35-21)20(31)32/h1-4,12,14-15,19,21-25,27-30H,(H,31,32)/t12-,14-,15+,19-,21+/m0/s1 Key: KHVMAMXQPVHXTJ-ORYXKJSJBB
- SMILES: C1=CC(=C(C=C1C2=C(C(=O)C3=C(O2)C(=C(C=C3O)O)O[C@H]4[C@@H]([C@H]([C@@H]([C@H](O4)C(=O)O)O)O)O)O)O)O

Properties
Chemical formula	C_{21}H_{18}O_{14}
Molar mass	494.36 g/mol
- Except where otherwise noted, data are given for materials in their standard state (at 25 °C [77 °F], 100 kPa). Infobox references

Hibifolin is a flavonol glycoside that prevents beta-amyloid-induced neurotoxicity in vitro.
