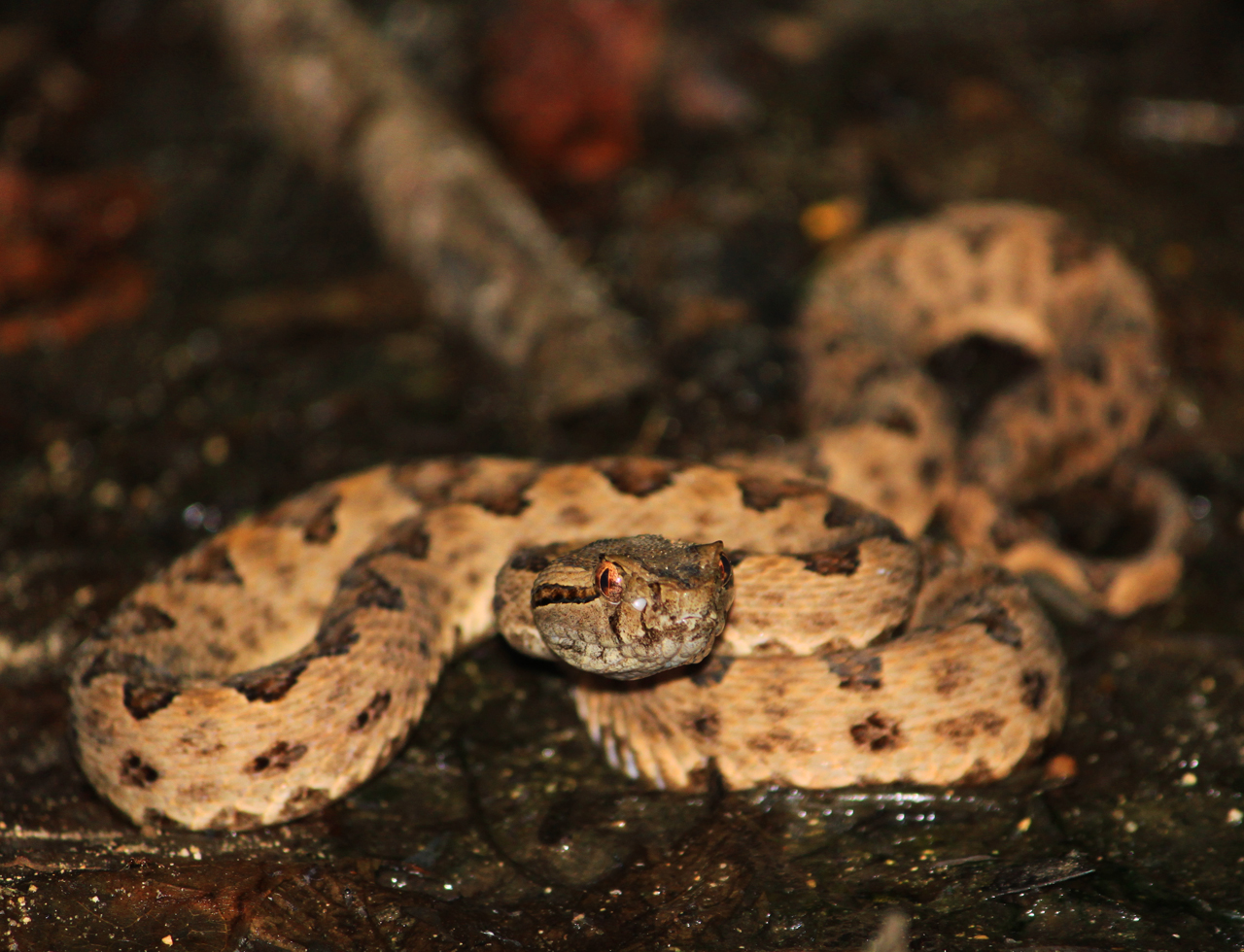

Conservation status
- Least Concern (IUCN 3.1)

Scientific classification
- Kingdom: Animalia
- Phylum: Chordata
- Class: Reptilia
- Order: Squamata
- Suborder: Serpentes
- Family: Viperidae
- Genus: Protobothrops
- Species: P. elegans

Binomial name
- Protobothrops elegans (Gray, 1849)

Synonyms
- Craspedocephalus elegans Gray, 1849; Trimeresurus luteus Boettger, 1895; Lachesis luteus – Boulenger, 1896; Lachesis lutea – Boettger, 1898; Trimeresurus elegans – Stejneger, 1907; Trimeresurus mucrosq[uamatus]. elegans – Mell, 1929; Protobothrops elegans – Kraus, Mink & Brown, 1996

= Protobothrops elegans =

Species of snake

Protobothrops elegans is a pit viper species endemic to Japan in the southern Ryukyu Islands. No subspecies are currently recognized. Common names include: elegant pit viper, Sakishima habu (サキシマハブ), and elegant tree viper.

== Description ==
Scalation of Protobothrops elegans includes 25 (sometimes 23) rows of dorsal scales at midbody, 179–192 (males) or 182–196 (females) ventral scales, 63–90 subcaudal scales, and 8 (sometimes 7 or 9) supralabial scales.

During 1965–2011, 2447 snakebites from this snake are reported with one fatality.

== Geographic distribution ==
Protobothrops elegans is found in Japan in the southern Ryukyu Islands, specifically in the Yaeyama Islands. The type locality is unknown. Boulenger listed it as "---- ?" while Gray's original 1849 description gives "West Coast of [North?] America." A restriction to "Ishigaki-Shima [Ryukyu Islands, Japan]" was proposed by Stejneger (1907).

== See also ==
- Snakebite
