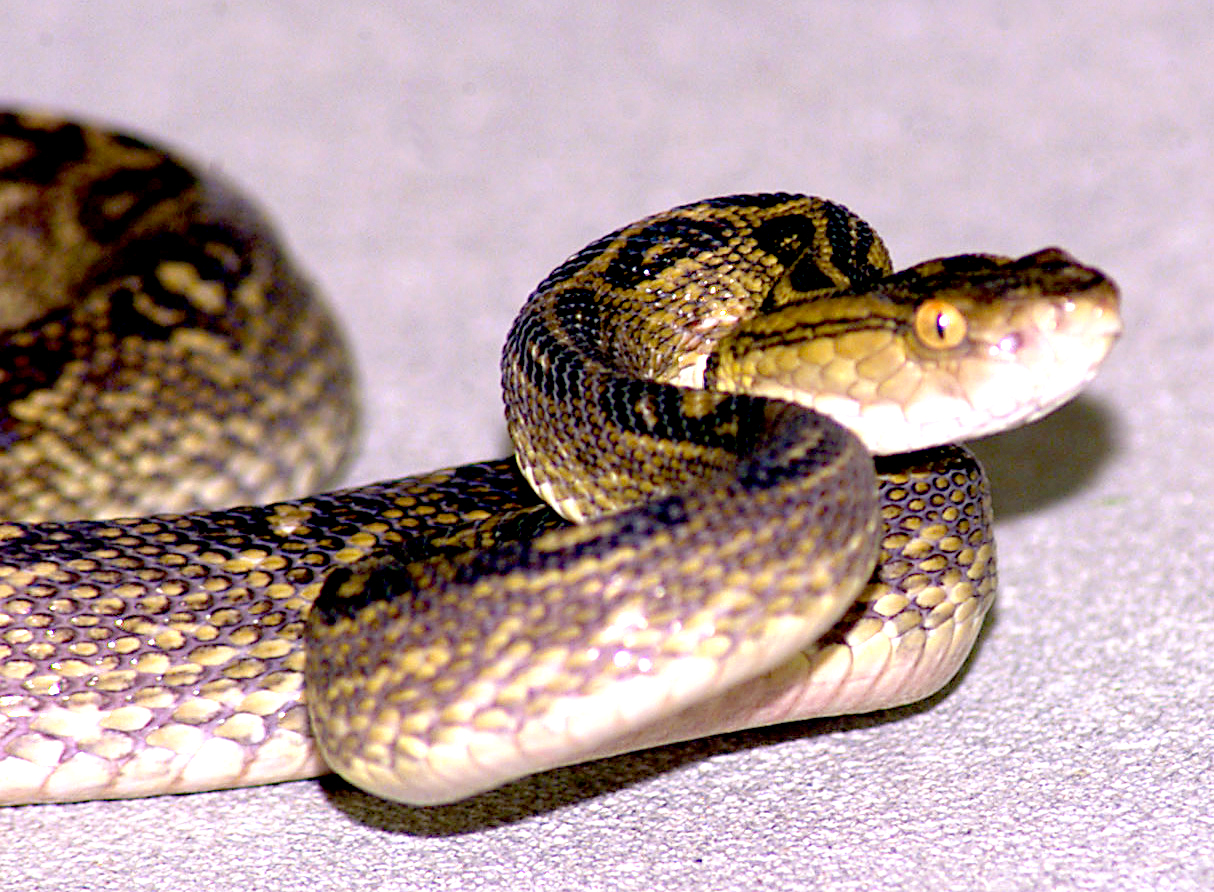

Conservation status
- Least Concern (IUCN 3.1)

Scientific classification
- Kingdom: Animalia
- Phylum: Chordata
- Class: Reptilia
- Order: Squamata
- Suborder: Serpentes
- Family: Viperidae
- Genus: Protobothrops
- Species: P. flavoviridis

Binomial name
- Protobothrops flavoviridis (Hallowell, 1861)

Synonyms
- Bothrops flavoviridis Hallowell, 1861; Trimeresurus riukiuanus Hilgendorf, 1880; T[rimeresurus]. flavoviridis Boulenger, 1890; Lachesis flavoviridis – Boulenger, 1896; Trimeresurus flavoviridis tinkhami Gloyd, 1955; Trimeresurus flavoviridis flavoviridis Gloyd, 1955

= Protobothrops flavoviridis =

Species of pit viper of the Ryukyu Islands of Japan

Protobothrops flavoviridis, also known commonly as the Okinawa habu is a species of pit viper, a venomous snake in the subfamily Crotalinae of the family Viperidae. The species is endemic to the Ryukyu Islands of Japan. No subspecies are recognized as being valid. Local common names include habu and Kume Shima habu. The term "habu" in Okinawa Prefecture can also refer to the Sakishima habu (Protobothrops elegans) alternately called the elegant pit viper.

== Description ==
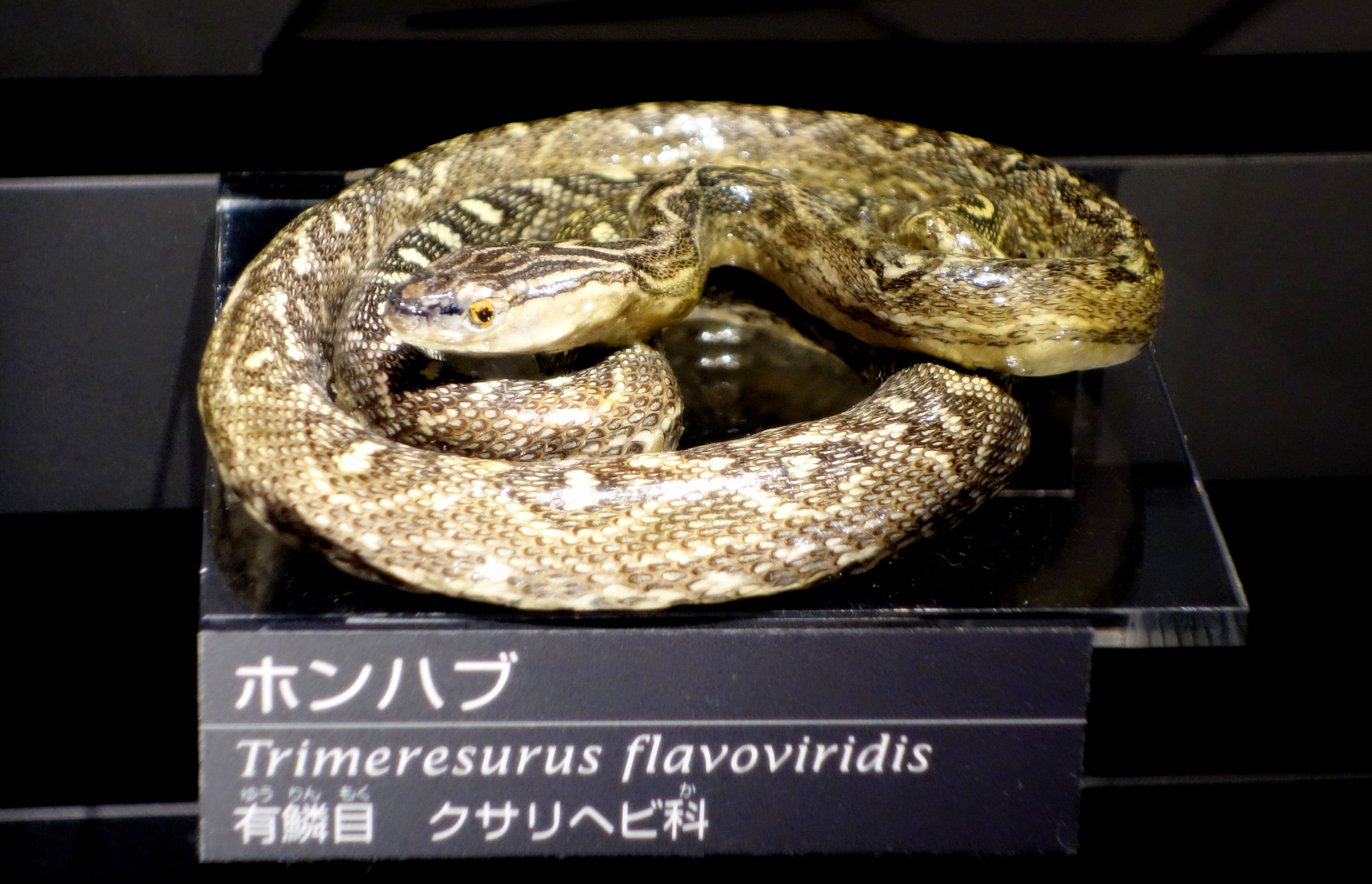
Mounted specimen at the National Museum of Nature and Science, Tokyo, Japan

Growing to an average total length (tail included) of 4–5 feet (120–150 cm), with a maximum of 7.9 feet (240 cm), Protobothrops flavoviridis is the largest member of its genus. It is slenderly built and gracefully proportioned with a large head. The crown of the head is covered with small scales. P. flavoviridis has a light olive or brown ground color, overlaid with elongated dark green or brownish blotches. The blotches have yellow edges, sometimes contain yellow spots, and frequently fuse to produce wavy stripes. The belly is whitish with dark coloring along the edges.

== Geographic distribution and habitat ==
The Okinawa habu is restricted to the Japanese Ryukyu Islands, including Okinawa and the Amami Islands. The type locality is "Amakarima Island (one of the Loo-Choo group)" (= Keramashima, Ryukyu Islands). It is common on the larger volcanic islands, but not present on the smaller coral islands.

The species is often reported from the transition zone between palm forest and cultivated fields. It may also be found on rock walls and in old tombs and caves.

== Ecology ==
The species Protobothrops flavoviridis is terrestrial and mostly nocturnal. It often enters homes and other structures in search of rats and mice. Bold and irritable, it can strike quickly and has a long reach.

Unlike most pit vipers, the habu is oviparous and lays eggs, rather than bearing live young. Mating takes place in early spring and up to 18 eggs are laid in mid-summer. The hatchlings, which emerge after an incubation period of 5–6 weeks, are 25 cm (10 in) in length and look the same as the adults.

To reduce the population of P. flavoviridis on the island of Okinawa, the small Indian mongoose (Herpestes javanicus), was introduced in 1910. Although the effects of this introduction have not been studied, in other such cases, the negative effects on species of native birds, mammals, and herpetofauna have been a source of concern for wildlife managers.

== Venom ==
The incidence of snakebite in the Amami Islands is two per 1,000 people, which is considered very high. The venom of this species is of high toxicity, containing cytotoxin and hemorrhagin components, yet the fatality rate is less than 1%. A bite from a habu snake can cause nausea, vomiting, hypotension, and possibly death. In some cases, victims reported the loss of motor function in hands and legs following treatment. If a bite victim receives medical care promptly, bites are not life-threatening. However, 6–8% do suffer permanent disability.

LD_{50} values of 3.1, 4.3, 3.7, 2.7, 3.7, and 3.8 mg/kg intravenous, 5.1 mg/kg intraperitoneal, and 6.0, 3.5-5.0, and 4.5 mg/kg subcutaneous administrations have been reported for the venom.

== Use by humans ==
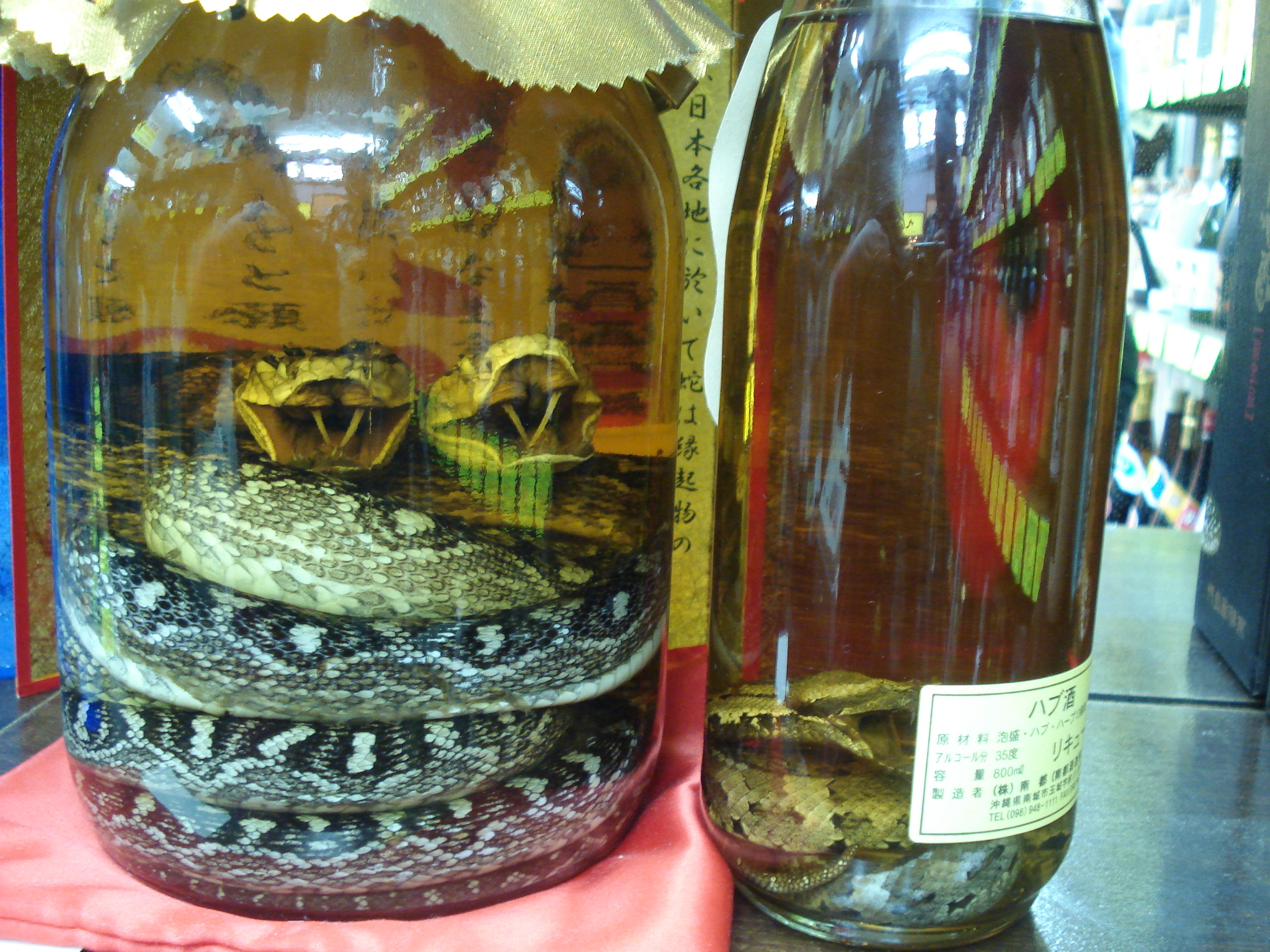
A bottle of "habushu". P. flavoviridis has been subject to overhunting for use in traditional liquor-making.

On the island of Okinawa, Protobothrops flavoviridis is heavily collected, primarily for use in habushu (ハブ酒). In this case, the sake is a liquor called awamori (泡盛), alleged to have medicinal properties. As is typical with snake wine, the snakes may be inserted into the container while still alive, causing them to drown, or the snake may be stunned first and gutted while still alive. The production includes the body in the fermentation process, and it is sold in bottles that may or may not retain the body of a snake (or other animals such as lizards or scorpions).
