= Stichodactyla toxin =

Protein family

ShK domain-like
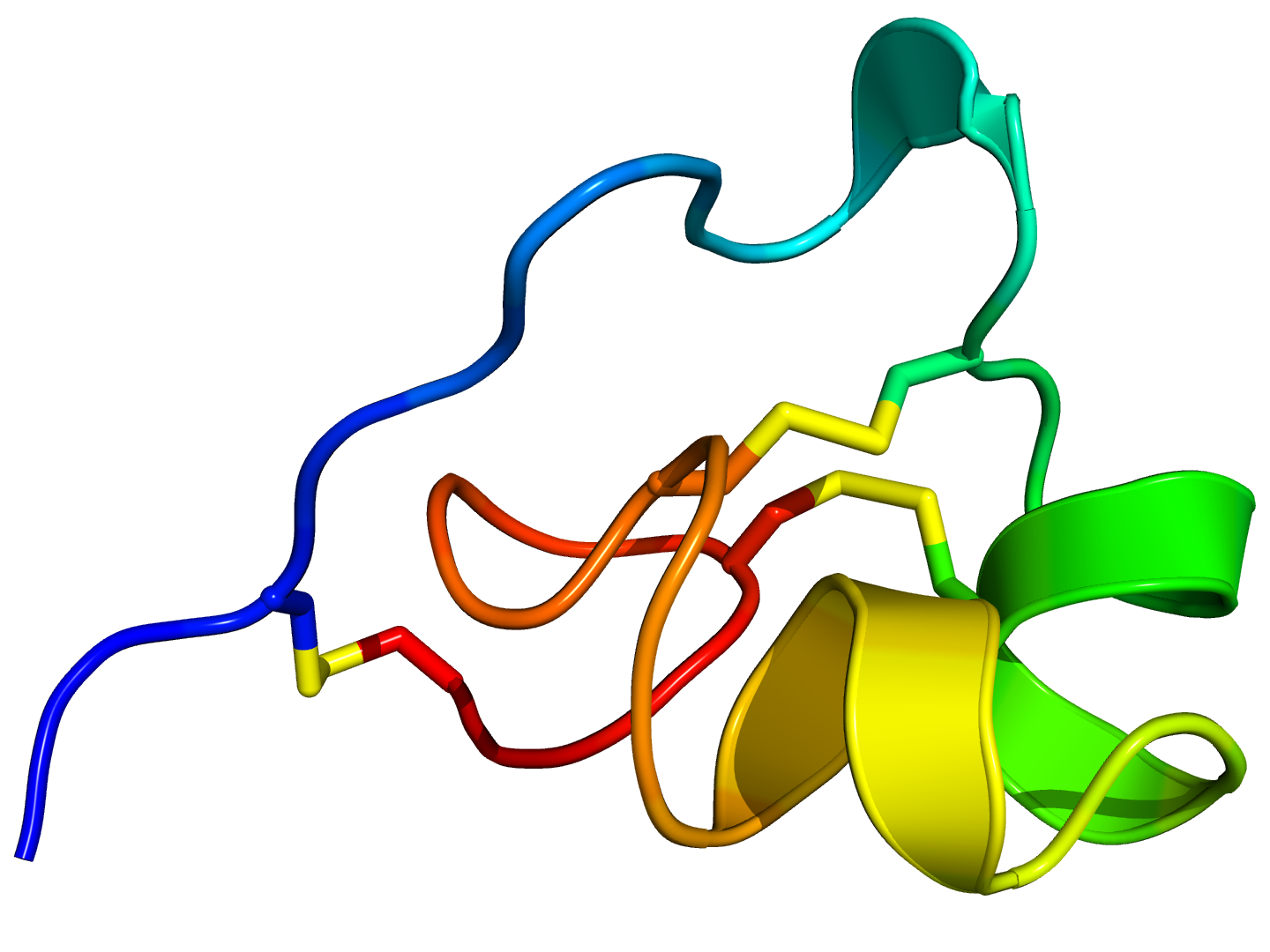
- Rainbow colored cartoon diagram (N-terminus = blue, C-terminus = red) of an NMR solution structure of the ShK toxin. Sidechains of cysteine residues involved in disulfide linkages are displayed as sticks and the sulfur atoms in these links are colored yellow.

Identifiers
- Symbol: ShK
- Pfam: PF01549
- InterPro: IPR003582
- SMART: SM00254
- SCOP2: 1roo / SCOPe / SUPFAM
- TCDB: 8.B.14
- OPM superfamily: 296
- OPM protein: 2lg4
Available protein structures:
- PDB: IPR003582 PF01549 (ECOD; PDBsum)
- AlphaFold: IPR003582; PF01549

Kappa-stichotoxin-She3a

Identifiers
- Organism: Stichodactyla helianthus
- Symbol: ?
- Orthologs: OMA: entry
- UniProt: P29187
Search for
- Structures: Swiss-model
- Domains: InterPro

Stichodactyla toxin (ShK, ShkT) is a 35-residue basic peptide from the sea anemone Stichodactyla helianthus that blocks a number of potassium channels. Related peptides form a conserved family of protein domains known as the ShkT domain. Another well-studied toxin of the family is BgK from Bunodosoma granulifera.

An analogue of the toxin called Dalazatide is in human trials as a therapeutic for autoimmune diseases.

== History ==
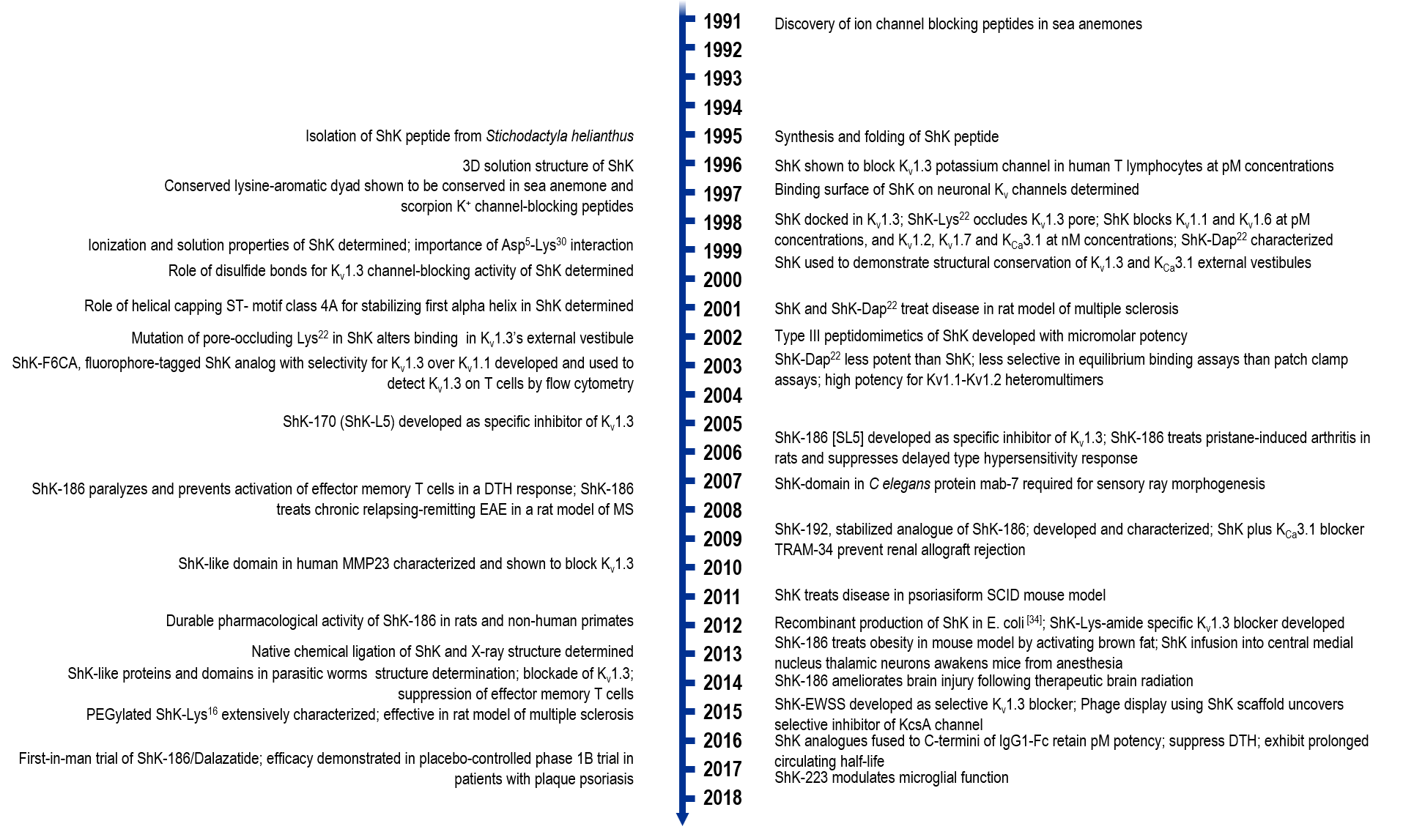
A development timeline

Stichodactyla helianthus is a species of sea anemone (Phylum: Cnidaria) belonging to the family Stichodactylidae. Helianthus comes from the Greek words helios meaning sun, and anthos meaning flower, which corresponds to the species' common name "sun anemone". It is sessile and uses potent neurotoxins for defense against its primary predator, the spiny lobster. The venom contains, among other components, numerous ion channel-blocking peptides. In 1995, a group led by Olga Castaneda and Evert Karlsson isolated ShK, a potassium channel-blocking 35-residue peptide from S. helianthus. The same year, William Kem and his collaborator Michael Pennington synthesized and folded ShK, and showed it blocked neuronal and lymphocyte voltage-dependent potassium channels. In 1996, Ray Norton determined the three-dimensional structure of ShK. In 2005–2006, George Chandy, Christine Beeton and Michael Pennington developed ShK-170 and ShK-186 (ShK-L5), selective blockers of K_{v}1.3. ShK-186, now called Dalazatide, was advanced to human trials in 2015-2017 by Shawn Iadonato and Eric Tarcha, as the first-in-man K_{v}1.3 blocker for autoimmune disease.

== Structure ==
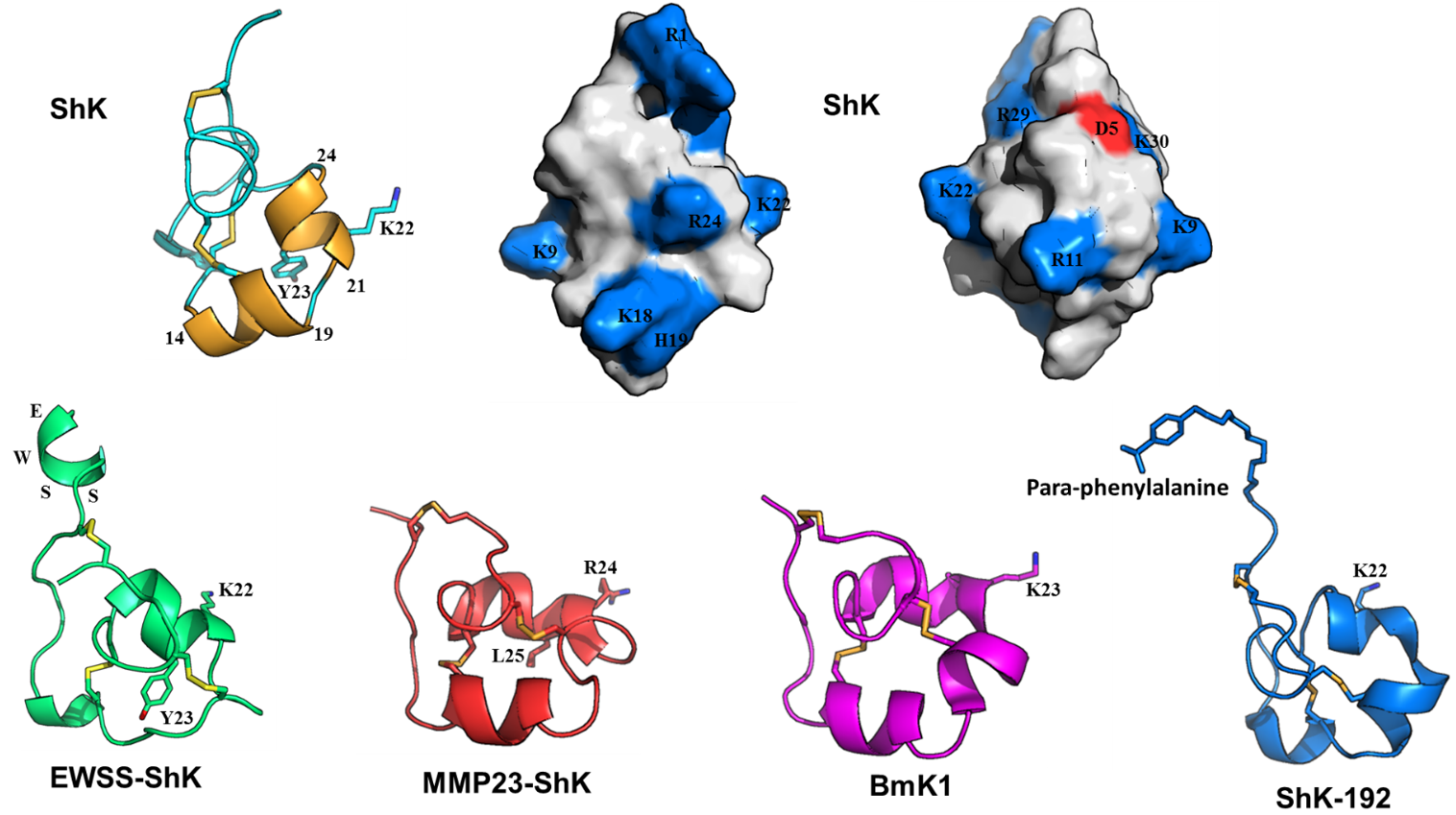
Clockwise from top-left: NMR solution structure of the ShK toxin; Two views of the surface representation of ShK highlighting basic (blue) and acidic (red) residues; NMR structures of ShK-192, BmK1, MMP23-ShK, and homology model of EWSS-ShK.

ShK is cross-linked by three disulfide bridges: Cys3-Cys35, Cys12-Cys28, and Cys17-Cys32. The solution structure of ShK reveals two short α-helices comprising residues 14-19 and 21–24; the N-terminal eight residues adopt an extended conformation, followed by a pair of interlocking turns that resemble a 3_{10} helix; the C-terminal Cys35 residue forms a nearly head-to-tail cyclic structure through a disulfide bond with Cys3.

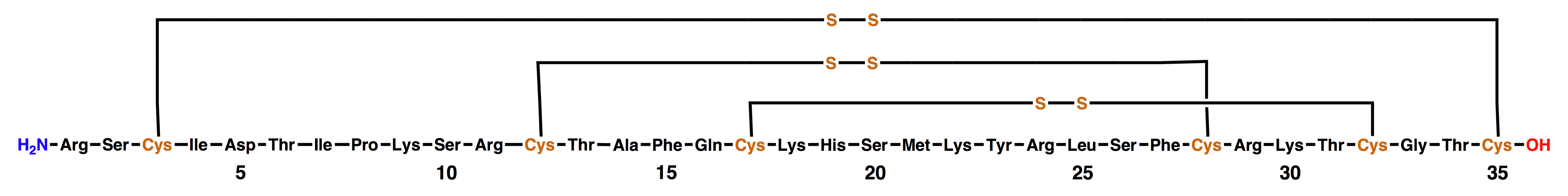
Schematic diagram of the primary structure of the ShK peptide highlighting the three disulfide (–S–S–) linkages.

== Phylogenetic relationships of ShK and ShK domains ==
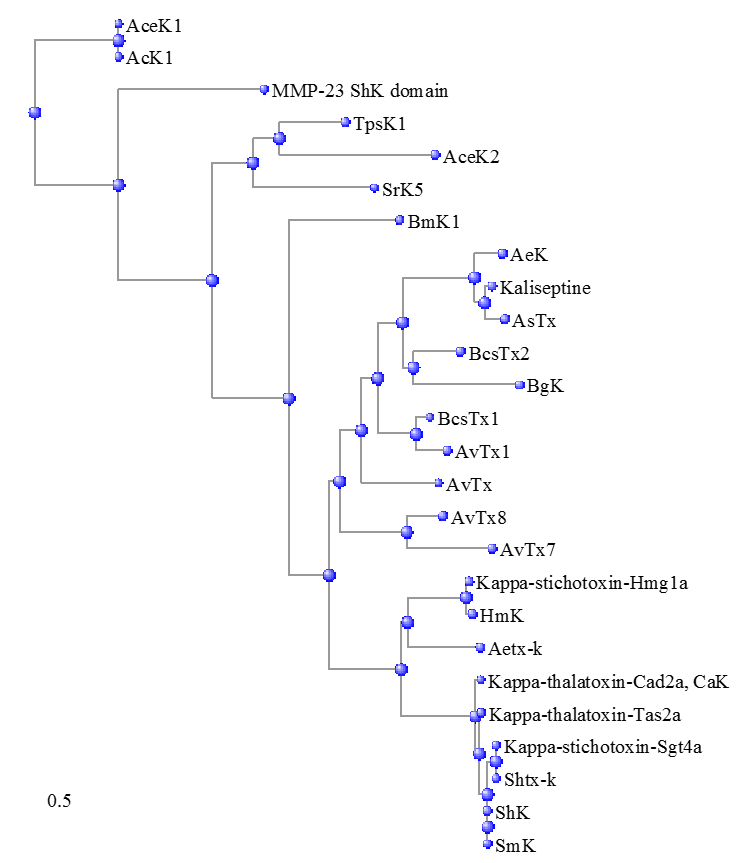
Sequence similarity tree between ShK and related peptides generated with NCBI's Constraint-based Multiple Alignment Tool (COBALT).

The SMART database at the EMBL, as of May 2018, lists 3345 protein domains with structural resemblance to ShK in 1797 proteins (1 to 8 domains/protein), many in the worm Caenorhabditis elegans and venomous snakes. The majority of these domains are in metallopeptidases, whereas others are in prolyl 4-hydroxylases, tyrosinases, peroxidases, oxidoreductases, or proteins containing epidermal growth factor-like domains, thrombospondin-type repeats, or trypsin-like serine protease domains. The only human proteins containing ShK-like domains are MMP-23 (matrix metalloprotease 23) and MFAP-2 (microfibril-associated glycoprotein 2).

== Channel targets ==
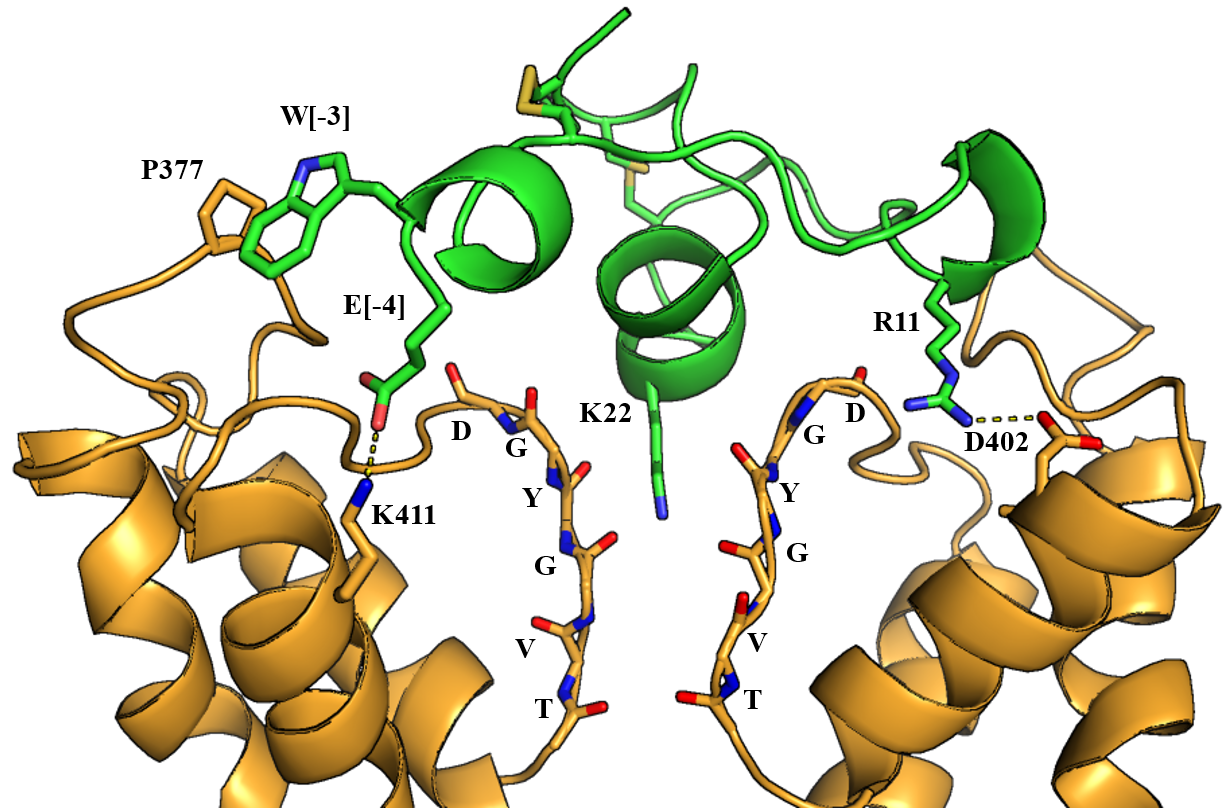
Docking configuration of EWSS-ShK in Kv1.3. For clarity, only two of the four Kv1.3 subunits in the tetramer are shown. Lys22 is shown protruding into the pore and interacting with the channel's selectivity filter.

The ShK peptide blocks potassium (K^{+}) ion channels K_{v}1.1, K_{v}1.3, K_{v}1.6, K_{v}3.2 and K_{Ca}3.1 with nanomolar to picomolar potency, and has no effect on the HERG (K_{v}11.1) cardiac potassium channel. The neuronal K_{v}1.1 channel and the T lymphocyte K_{v}1.3 channel are most potently inhibited by ShK.

=== Binding configuration in K^{+} channels ===
ShK and its analogues are blockers of the channel pore. They bind to all four subunits in the K^{+} channel tetramer by interacting with the shallow 'vestibule' at the outer entrance to the channel pore. These peptides are anchored in the external vestibule by two key interactions. The first is Lys22, which protrudes into and occludes the channel's pore like a "cork in a bottle" and blocks the passage of potassium ions through the channel pore. The second is the neighboring Tyr23, which together with Lys22 forms a "functional dyad" required for channel block. Many K^{+} channel-blocking peptides contain such a dyad of a lysine and a neighboring aromatic or aliphatic residue. Some K^{+} channel-blocking peptides lack the functional dyad, but even in these peptides a lysine physically blocks the channel, regardless of the position of the lysine in the peptide sequence. Additional interactions anchor ShK and its analogues in the external vestibule and contribute to potency and selectivity. For example, Arg11 and Arg29 in ShK interact with two Asp386 residues in adjacent subunits in the mouse K_{v}1.3 external vestibule (corresponds to Asp433 in human K_{v}1.3).

IC_{50} values for block of potassium channels by ShK and related peptides. ND = not done.
Channel	ShK(IC_{50})	ShK-186 (IC_{50})	ShK-192 (IC_{50})	ShK-EWSS (IC_{50})	ShK-F6CA (IC_{50})	ShK-198 (IC_{50})	MMP-23 ShK domain (IC_{50})
K_{v}1.1	16-28 pM	7 nM	22 nM	5.4 nM	4 nM	159 pM	49 μM
K_{v}1.2	10 nM	48 nM	ND	>100 nM	>100 nM	ND	>100 μM
K_{v}1.3	10-16 pM	70 pM	140 pM	34 pM	48 pM	41 pM	2.8 μM
K_{v}1.6	200 pM	18 nM	10.6 nM	ND	ND	ND	400 nM
K_{v}3.2	5 nM	20 nM	4.2 nM	ND	ND	ND	49 μM
K_{Ca}3.1	30 nM	115 nM	>100 nM	>100 nM	ND	ND	>100 μM

=== Analogues that block the Kv1.3 channel ===
Several ShK analogues have been generated to enhance specificity for the K_{v}1.3 channel over the neuronal K_{v}1.1 channel and other closely related channels.

- ShK-Dap^{22}: This was the first analogue that showed some degree of specificity for K_{v}1.3. The pore-occluding lysine^{22} of ShK is replaced by diaminopropionic acid (Dap) in ShK-Dap^{22}. Dap is a non-natural lysine analogue with a shorter side chain length (2.5 Å from C_{α}) than lysine (6.3 Å). Dap^{22} interacts with residues further out in the external vestibule in contrast to lysine^{22}, which interacts with the channel's selectivity filter. As a consequence, the orientations of ShK and ShK-Dap^{22} in the external vestibule are significantly different. ShK-Dap^{22} exhibits >20-fold selectivity for K_{v}1.3 over closely related channels in whole-cell patch clamp experiments, but in equilibrium binding assays it binds K_{v}1.1-K_{v}1.2 heterotetramers with almost the same potency as ShK, which is not predicted from the study of homotetrameric K_{v}1.1 or K_{v}1.2 channels.
- ShK-F6CA: Attaching a fluorescein to the N-terminus of the peptide via a hydrophilic AEEA linker (2-aminoethoxy-2-ethoxy acetic acid; mini-PEG) resulted in a peptide, ShK-F6CA (fluorescein-6-carboxyl), with 100-fold specificity for K_{v}1.3 over K_{v}1.1 and related channels. Attachment of a tetramethylrhodamine or a biotin via the AEEA linker to ShK's N-terminus did not increase specificity for K_{v}1.3 over K_{v}1.1. The enhanced specificity of ShK-F6CA might be explained by differences in charge: F6CA is negatively charged; tetramethylrhodamine is positively charged; and biotin is neutral. Subsequent studies with other analogues suggest that the negatively charged F6CA likely interacts with residues on the turret of the K_{v}1.3 channel as shown for ShK-192 and ShK-EWSS.
- ShK-170, ShK-186, ShK-192 and ShK-EWSS: Based on ShK-F6CA, additional analogues were made. Attaching a L-phosphotyrosine to the N-terminus of ShK via an AEEA linker resulted in a peptide, ShK-170, with 100-1000-fold specificity for K_{v}1.3 over related channels. ShK-186 (a.k.a. SL5; a.k.a. Dalazatide) is identical to ShK-170 except the C-terminal carboxyl is replaced by an amide. ShK-186 blocks K_{v}1.3 with an IC_{50} of 69 pM and exhibits the same specificity for K_{v}1.3 over closely related channels as ShK-170. The L-phosphotyrosine of ShK-170 and ShK-186 rapidly gets dephosphorylated in vivo generating an analogue, ShK-198, with reduced specificity for K_{v}1.3. To overcome this problem, ShK-192 and ShK-EWSS were developed. In ShK-192, the N-terminal L-phosphotyrosine is replaced by a non-hydrolyzable para-phosphonophenylalanine (Ppa), and Met21 is replaced by the non-natural amino acid norleucine to avoid methionine oxidation. In ShK-EWSS, the AEEA linker and L-phosphotyrosine are replaced by the residues glutamic acid (E), tryptophan (W) and two serines (S). Both ShK-192 and ShK-EWSS are highly specific for K_{v}1.3 over related channels.
- ShK-K18A: Docking and molecular dynamics simulations on K_{v}1.3 and K_{v}1.1 followed by umbrella sampling simulations, paved the way to the selective Kv1.3 inhibitor ShK-K18A.
- ShK-related peptides in parasitic worms: AcK1, a 51-residue peptide from hookworms Ancylostoma caninum and Ancylostoma ceylanicum, and BmK1, the C-terminal domain of a metalloprotease from filarial worm Brugia malayi, adopt helical structures closely resembling ShK. AcK1 and BmK1 block K_{v}1.3 channels at nanomolar-micromolar concentrations, and they suppress rat effector memory T cells without affecting naïve and central memory T cell subsets. Further, they suppress IFN-g production by human T cells and they inhibit the Delayed-type hypersensitivity response caused by skin-homing effector memory T cells. Teladorsagia circumcincta is an economically important parasite that infects sheep and goats. TcK6, a 90-residue protein with a C-terminal ShK-related domain, is upregulated during the mucosal dwelling larval stage of this parasite. TcK6 causes modest suppression of thapsigargin-triggered IFN-g production by sheep T cells, suggesting that the parasite use this protein for immune evasion by modulating mucosal T cells.

== Extending circulating half-life ==
Due to their low molecular mass, ShK and its analogues are prone to rapid renal elimination. In rats, the half-life is ~6 min for ShK-186 and ~11 min for ShK-198, with a clearance rate of ~950 ml/kg·min. In monkeys, the half-life is ~12 min for ShK-186 and ~46 min for ShK-198, with a clearance rate of ~80 ml/kg·min.

PEGylation of ShK: Conjugation of polyethylene glycol (PEG) to ShK[Q16K], an ShK analogue, increased its molecular mass and thereby reduced renal clearance and extended plasma half-life to 15 h in mice and 64 h in cynomolgus monkeys. PEGylation can also decrease immunogenicity and protect a peptide from proteolysis and non-specific adsorption to inert surfaces. PEGylated ShK[Q16K] prevented adoptive-transfer experimental autoimmune encephalomyelitis in rats, a model for multiple sclerosis.

- Conjugation of ShK to larger proteins: The circulating half-life of peptides can be prolonged by coupling them to larger proteins or protein domains. By screening a combinatorial ShK peptide library, novel analogues were identified, which when fused to the C-termini of IgG1-Fc retained picomolar potency, effectively suppressed in vivo delayed type hypersensitivity and exhibited a prolonged circulating half-life.
- Prolonged effects despite rapid plasma clearance: SPECT/CT imaging studies with a ^{111}In-DOTA-conjugate of ShK-186 in rats and squirrel monkeys revealed a slow release from the injection site and blood levels above the channel blocking dose for 2 and 7 days, respectively. Studies on human peripheral blood T cells showed that a brief exposure to ShK-186 was sufficient to suppress cytokine responses. These findings suggest that ShK-186, despite its short circulating half-life, may have a prolonged therapeutic effect. In rats, the peptide is effective in treating disease in animal models of autoimmune diseases when administered once a day to once in 3 days. In humans, subcutaneous injections twice a week are sufficient to ameliorate disease in patients with plaque psoriasis.

=== Peptide delivery ===
The low molecular mass of ShK and its analogues, combined with their high isoelectric points, makes it unlikely that these peptides will be absorbed from the stomach or intestine following oral administration. Sub-lingual delivery is a possibility. A fluorescent ShK analogue was absorbed into the blood stream at pharmacological concentrations following sublingual administration with a mucoadhesive chitosan-based gel, with or without the penetration enhancer cetrimide. Delivery of the peptide as an aerosol through the lung, or across the skin, or as eye drops are also possibilities.

== Modulation of T cell function ==
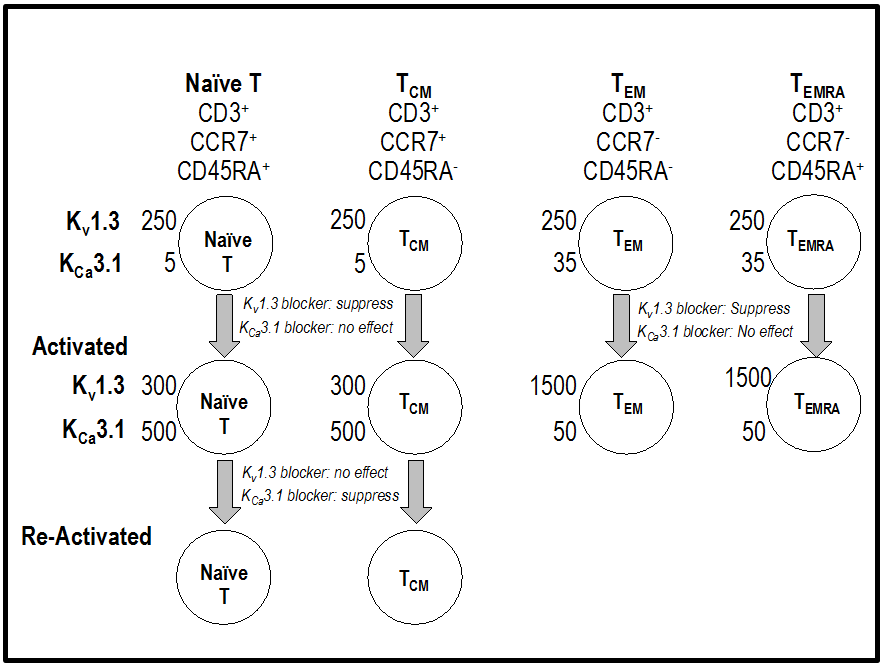
Expression of Kv1.3 and KCa3.1 channels during T cell activation and memory T cell generation. The numbers represent functional channel numbers per T cell determined by whole cell patch clamp. The effect of specific blockade of Kv1.3 or KCa3.1 on T cell proliferation is shown. TCM = Central memory T cell. TEM = Effector memory T cell. TEMRA = Effector memory T cell that has reacquired CD45RA.

During T cell-activation, calcium enters lymphocytes through store-operated CRAC channels (calcium release activated channel) formed as a complex of Orai and Stim proteins. The rise in intracellular calcium initiates a signaling cascade culminating in cytokine production and proliferation. The K_{v}1.3 K^{+} channel and the calcium-activated K_{Ca}3.1 K^{+} channel in T cells promote calcium entry into the cytoplasm through CRAC by providing a counterbalancing cation efflux. Blockade of K_{v}1.3 depolarizes the membrane potential of T cells, suppresses calcium signaling and IL-2 production, but not IL2-receptor expression. K_{v}1.3 blockers have no effect on activation pathways that are independent of a rise in intracellular calcium (e.g. anti-CD28, IL-2). Expression of the K_{v}1.3 and K_{Ca}3.1 channels varies during T cell activation and differentiation into memory T cells. When naïve T cells and central memory T cells (T_{CM}) are activated they upregulate K_{Ca}3.1 expression to ~500 per cell without significant change in K_{v}1.3 numbers. In contrast, when terminally differentiated effector memory subsets (T_{EM}, T_{EMRA} [T effector memory re-expressing CD45RA]) are activated, they upregulate K_{v}1.3 to 1500 per cell without changes in K_{Ca}3.1. The K_{v}1.3 channel number increases and the K_{Ca}3.1 channel number decreases as T cells are chronically activated. As a result of this differential expression, blockers of K_{Ca}3.1 channels preferentially suppress the function of naïve and T_{CM} cells, while ShK and its analogues that selectively inhibit K_{v}1.3 channels preferentially suppress the function of chronically activated effector memory T cells (T_{EM}, T_{EMRA}).

Of special interest are the large number of ShK analogues developed at Amgen that suppressed interleukin-2 and interferon gamma production by T cells. This inhibitory effect of K_{v}1.3 blockers is partial and stimulation strength dependent, with reduced inhibitory efficacy on T cells under strengthened anti-CD3/CD28 stimulation. Chronically activated CD28^{null} effector memory T cells are implicated in autoimmune diseases (e.g. lupus, Crohn's disease, rheumatoid arthritis, multiple sclerosis).

Blockade of K_{v}1.3 channels in these chronically activated T cells suppresses calcium signaling, cytokine production (interferon gamma, interleukin-2, interleukin 17), and cell proliferation. Effector memory T cells that are CD28^{+} are refractory to suppression by K_{v}1.3 blockers when they are co-stimulated by anti-CD3 and anti-CD28 antibodies, but are sensitive to suppression when stimulated by anti-CD3 antibodies alone. In vivo, ShK-186 paralyzes effector-memory T cells at the site of an inflammatory delayed type hypersensitivity response and prevents these T cells from activating in the inflamed tissue. In contrast, ShK-186 does not affect the homing and motility of naive and T_{CM} cells to and within lymph nodes, most likely because these cells express the K_{Ca}3.1 channel and are therefore protected from the effect of K_{v}1.3 blockade.

== Effects on microglia ==
K_{v}1.3 plays an important role in microglial activation. ShK-223, an analogue of ShK-186, decreased lipopolysaccharide (LPS) induced focal adhesion formation by microglia, reversed LPS-induced inhibition of microglial migration, and inhibited LPS-induced upregulation of EH domain containing protein 1 (EHD1), a protein involved in microglia trafficking. Increased K_{v}1.3 expression was reported in microglia in Alzheimer plaques. K_{v}1.3 inhibitors may have use in the management of Alzheimer's disease, as reported in a proof-of-concept study in which a small molecule K_{v}1.3 blocker (PAP-1) alleviated Alzheimer's disease-like characteristics in a mouse model of AD.

== Efficacy of analogues in animal models of human diseases ==
=== Experimental autoimmune encephalomyelitis (EAE), a model for multiple sclerosis ===
ShK, ShK-Dap^{22}, ShK-170 and PEGylated ShK-Q16K prevent adoptive-transfer EAE in Lewis rats, a model of multiple sclerosis. Since multiple sclerosis is a relapsing-remitting disease, ShK-186 and ShK-192 were evaluated in a relapsing-remitting EAE model in DA (Dark Agouti) rats. Both prevented and treated disease when administered once a day to once in three days. Thus, K_{v}1.3 inhibitors are effective in treating disease in rat models of multiple sclerosis when administered alone, and therapeutic effectiveness does not appear to be compromised by compensatory over-expression of K_{Ca}3.1 channels.

=== Pristane-induced arthritis (PIA), a model for rheumatoid arthritis ===
ShK-186 was effective in treating PIA when administered every day or on alternate days. A scorpion toxin inhibitor of K_{V}1.3 was also effective in this model. In both these studies, blockade of K_{v}1.3 alone was sufficient to ameliorate disease and simultaneous blockade of K_{Ca}3.1 was not necessary as has been suggested.

=== Rat models of atopic dermatitis ===
Most infiltrating T-cells in skin lesions from patients with moderate-to-severe atopic dermatitis (AD) express high levels of K_{v}1.3, suggesting that inhibitors of K_{v}1.3 may be effective in treating AD. Ovalbumin-induced delayed type hypersensitivity and oxazolone-induced dermatitis are considered to be models of atopic dermatitis. ShK, ShK-170, ShK-186, ShK-192 and ShK-IgG-Fc were all effective in the ovalbumin-induced delayed type hypersensitivity model, while a topical formulation of ShK-198 was effective in treating oxazolone-induced dermatitis. Even where compensation by K_{Ca}3.1 channels was reported to over-ride K_{V}1.3 block, ShK administered alone suppressed delayed type hypersensitivity significantly in 2 of 3 studies, albeit modestly.

=== Psoriasis ===
Psoriasis is a severe autoimmune disease of the skin that afflicts many people worldwide. Despite the success of recent biologics in ameliorating disease, there is still a search for safe and effective drugs for psoriasis. K_{V}1.3 inhibitors (ShK, PAP-1) have been reported to treat disease in psoriasiform (psoriasis-like) SCID (severe combined immunodeficiency) mouse model. In a Phase 1b placebo-controlled clinical study in patients with plaque psoriasis, ShK-186 administered twice a week (30 or 60 mg/dose/patient) by subcutaneous injection caused improvements with a statistically significant reduction in their PASI (Psoriasis Area and Severity Index) score between baseline and day 32. These patients also exhibited reduced plasma levels of multiple inflammation markers and decreased expression of T cell activation markers on peripheral blood memory T cells.

=== Diet-induced obesity and fatty liver disease ===
Obesity and diabetes are major healthcare problems globally. There is need for safe drugs for these metabolic diseases. In a mouse model of diet-induced obesity, ShK-186 counteracted the negative effects of increased caloric intake. It reduced weight gain, adiposity, and fatty liver; decreased blood levels of cholesterol, sugar, HbA1c, insulin, and leptin; and enhanced peripheral insulin sensitivity. Genetic deletion of the K_{v}1.3 gene has the same effect, indicating that ShK-186's effect is due to K_{v}1.3 blockade. At least two mechanisms contribute to ShK-186's therapeutic benefits. The high calorie diet induced K_{v}1.3 expression in brown fat tissues. By blocking K_{v}1.3, ShK-186 doubled glucose uptake and increased β-oxidation of fatty acids, glycolysis, fatty acid synthesis and uncoupling protein 1 expression by brown fat. As a consequence of brown fat activation, oxygen consumption and energy expenditure were augmented. The obesity diet also induced K_{v}1.3 expression in the liver, and ShK-186 caused profound alterations in energy and lipid metabolism in the liver. ShK, its analogues or other K_{v}1.3 blockers may have use in controlling the negative consequences of high calorie diets.

=== Arousal and anesthesia ===
The mechanisms of general anesthesia involve multiple molecular targets and pathways that are not completely understood. Sevoflurane is a common anesthetic used to induce general anesthesia during surgery. Rats continually exposed to sevoflurane lose their righting reflex as an index of loss of consciousness. In these rats, microinfusion of ShK into the central medial thalamic nucleus (CMT) reversed sevoflurane-induced anesthesia in rodents. ShK-treated rats righted themselves fully (restored consciousness) despite being continually exposed to sevoflurane. ShK-microinfusion into neighboring regions of the brain did not have this effect. Sevoflurane enhanced potassium currents in the CMT, while ShK and ShK-186 countered this effect. These studies suggest that ShK-sensitive K^{+} channels in the CMT are important for suppressing arousal during anesthesia.

=== Preventing brain damage following therapeutic brain radiation ===
Brain radiation is used to treat tumors of the head, neck, and brain, but this treatment carries a significant risk of neurologic injury. Injury is, in part, due to the activation of microglia and microglia-mediated damage of neurons. Neuroprotective therapies for radiation-induced brain injury are still limited. In a mouse model of brain radiation, ShK-170 reversed neurological deficits, and protected neurons from radiation-induced brain injury by suppressing microglia.

=== Toxicity of ShK and its analogues ===
==== ShK and ShK-Dap^{22} ====
ShK peptide has a low toxicity profile in mice. ShK is effective in treating autoimmune diseases at 10 to 100 mg/kg bodyweight. It has a median paralytic dose of approximately 25 mg/kg bodyweight (250-2500 higher than the pharmacological dose). In rats the therapeutic safety index is greater than 75-fold. ShK-Dap^{22} displayed a lower toxicity profile. A 1.0 mg dose did not induce any hyperactivity, seizures or mortality in rats. The median paralytic dose for ShK-Dap^{22} is about 200 mg/kg bodyweight (2000-20000 higher than pharmacological dose). PEGylated ShK[Q16K] showed no adverse toxicity in monkeys over a period of several months.

==== ShK-186/Dalazatide ====
ShK-186 also displays a low toxicity profile in rats. Daily administration of ShK-170 or ShK-186 (100 μg/kg/day) by subcutaneous injection over 4 weeks in rats does not induce any changes in blood counts, blood chemistry or histopathology. By virtue of suppressing only T_{EM} and T_{EMRA} cells, ShK-186 did not compromise protective immune responses to influenza virus and chlamydial infection in rats, most likely because naïve and T_{CM} cells unaffected by K_{v}1.3 blockade mounted effective immune responses. ShK-186 is poorly immunogenic and did not elicit anti-ShK antibodies in rats repeatedly administered the peptide. This is possibly because the peptide's disulfide-bonded structure hinders processing and antigen presentation by antigen-presenting cells. ShK-186 also shares sequence and structural similarity to a ShK-like domain in matrix metalloprotease 23, which may cause the immune system to assume it is a normal protein in the body. ShK-186 was safe in non-human primates. In Phase 1a and 1b trials in healthy human volunteers, ShK-186 was well tolerated, no grade 3 or 4 adverse effects or laboratory abnormalities were noted, and the predicted range of drug exposures were achieved. The most common adverse events were temporary mild (Grade 1) hypoesthesia and paresthesia involving the hands, feet, or perioral area. Mild muscle spasms, sensitivity of teeth, and injection site pain were also observed.

== Functions of ShK-like proteins ==
=== MMP-23 ===
MMP-23 belongs to the family of zinc- and calcium-dependent matrix metalloproteases. It is anchored in the cell membrane by an N-terminal prodomain, and it contains three extracellular domains: catalytic metalloprotease domain, ShK domain and immunoglobulin-like cell adhesion molecule (Ig-CaM) domain. The prodomain traps the voltage-gated potassium channel K_{V}1.3, but not the closely related K_{V}1.2 channel, in the endoplasmic reticulum. Studies with chimeras suggest that the prodomain interacts with the K_{V}1.3 region from the S5 transmembrane segment to the C terminus. NMR studies of the prodomain reveal a single trans-membrane alpha-helix, joined by a short linker to a juxta-membrane alpha-helix, which is associated with the surface of the membrane. The prodomain shares topological similarity with proteins (KCNE1, KCNE2, KCNE4) known to trap potassium channels in the secretory pathway, suggesting a shared mechanism of channel regulation. MMP-23's catalytic domain displays structural homology with catalytic domains in other metalloproteases, and likely functions as an endopeptidase. MMP-23's ShK domain lies immediately after the catalytic domain and is connected to the IgCAM domain by a short proline-rich linker. It shares phylogenetic relatedness to sea anemone toxins and ICR-CRISP domains, being most similar to the BgK toxin from sea anemone Bunodosoma granulifera. This ShK domain blocks voltage-gated potassium channels (K_{V}1.6 > K_{V}1.3 > K_{V}1.1 = K_{V}3.2 > K_{v}1.4, in decreasing potency) in the nanomolar to low micromolar range. K_{V}1.3 is required for sustaining calcium signaling during activation of human T cells. By trapping K_{V}1.3 in the endoplasmic reticulum via the prodomain, and by blocking the K_{V}1.3 channel with the ShK domain, MMP-23 may serve as an immune checkpoint to reduce excessive T cell activation during an immune response. In support, increased expression of MMP-23 in melanoma cancer cells decreases tumor-infiltrating lymphocytes, and is associated with cancer recurrence and shorter periods of progression-free survival. However, in melanomas, expression of MMP-23 does not correlate with K_{v}1.3 expression, suggesting that MMP-23's deleterious effect in melanomas may not be connected with its K_{v}1.3 channel-modulating function. MMP-23's C-terminal IgCAM domain shares sequence similarity with IgCAM domains in proteins known to mediate protein-protein and protein-lipid interactions (e.g. CDON, human Brother of CDO, ROBO1-4, hemicentin, NCAM1 and NCAM2). In summary, the four domains of MMP-23 may work synergistically to modulate immune responses in vivo.

=== Mab7 ===
In male Caenorhabditis elegans worms, the absence of a protein called Mab7 (Q95Q39) results in malformed sensory rays that are required for mating. Introduction of Mab7 into these male worms restores normal development of normal sensory rays. Introduction of Mab7 proteins lacking the ShK domain does not correct the defect of sensory rays, suggesting a role for the ShK-domain of Mab7 in sensory ray development.

=== HMP2 and PMP1 ===
HMP2 and PMP-1 are astacin metalloproteinases from the Cnidarian Hydra vulgaris and the jellyfish Podocoryne carnea that contain ShK-like domains at their C-termini. Both these ShK-domains contain the critical pore-occluding lysine required for K^{+} channel block. HMP2 plays a critical role in foot regeneration of Hydra, while PMP-1 is found in the feeding organ of the jelly fish and the ShK-domain may paralyze prey after they are ingested.

=== CRISPs ===
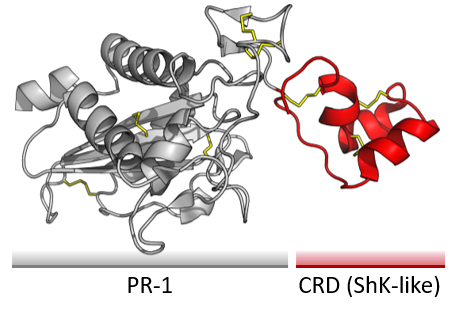
The two domains of a Cysteine-rich secretory protein (CRISP). CAP-like 'Pathogenesis-related 1' domain (PR-1) in white. ShK-like 'Cysteine-Rich Domain' (CRD) in red. Disulphides in yellow. (PDB: 1WVR)

More distantly related are Cysteine-rich secretory proteins (CRISPs), which contain a ShK-like 'Cystine-rich domain' as well as a larger CAP-like 'Pathogenesis related 1' domain. These proteins are involved in mammalian reproduction as well as in the venoms of some snakes. In both cases, the mechanism is believed to involve inhibition of ion channel activity.
