= Cysteine-rich secretory protein superfamily =

CAP
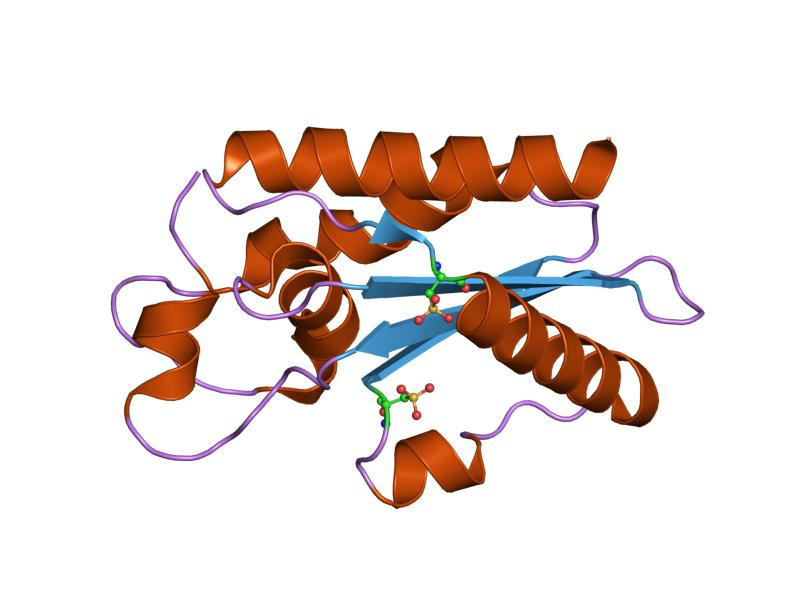
- crystal structure of golgi-associated pr-1 protein

Identifiers
- Symbol: CAP
- Pfam: PF00188
- Pfam clan: CL0659
- ECOD: 273.1.1
- InterPro: IPR014044
- PROSITE: PDOC00835
- SCOP2: 1s0p / SCOPe / SUPFAM
- Membranome: 209
Available protein structures:
- PDB: IPR014044 PF00188 (ECOD; PDBsum)
- AlphaFold: IPR014044; PF00188

Crisp-related
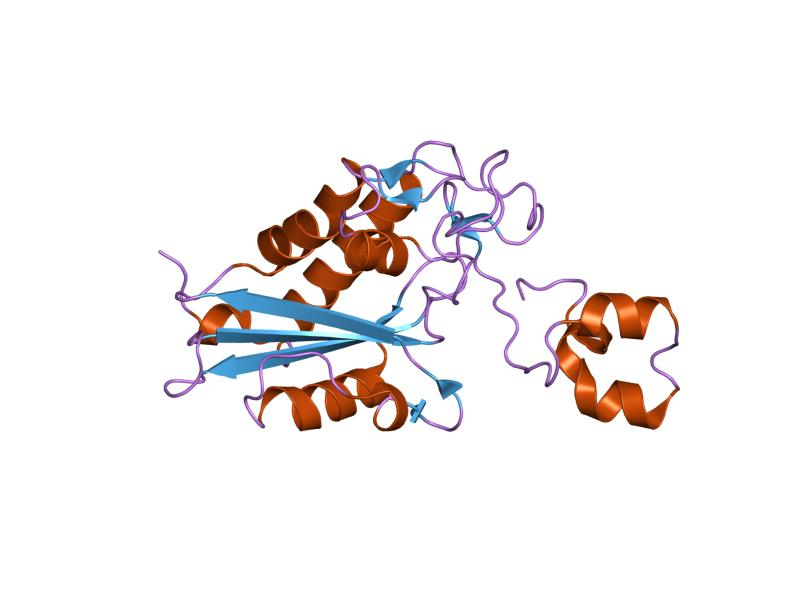
- crystal structure of stecrisp, a member of crisp family from trimeresurus stejnegeri refined at 1.6 angstroms resolution: structural relationship of the two domains

Identifiers
- Symbol: Crisp-related
- InterPro: IPR001283
Available protein structures:
- PDB: IPR001283
- AlphaFold: IPR001283

The CAP superfamily (cysteine-rich secretory proteins, antigen 5, and pathogenesis-related 1 proteins (CAP)) is a large superfamily of secreted proteins that are produced by a wide range of organisms, including prokaryotes and non-vertebrate eukaryotes.

The nine subfamilies of the mammalian CAP superfamily include: the human glioma pathogenesis-related 1 (GLIPR1), Golgi associated pathogenesis related-1 (GAPR1) proteins, peptidase inhibitor 15 (PI15), peptidase inhibitor 16 (PI16), cysteine-rich secretory proteins (CRISPs), CRISP LCCL domain containing 1 (CRISPLD1), CRISP LCCL domain containing 2 (CRISPLD2), mannose receptor like and the R3H domain containing like proteins. Members are most often secreted and have an extracellular endocrine or paracrine function and are involved in processes including the regulation of extracellular matrix and branching morphogenesis, potentially as either proteases or protease inhibitors; in ion channel regulation in fertility; as tumour suppressor or pro-oncogenic genes in tissues including the prostate; and in cell-cell adhesion during fertilisation. The overall protein structural conservation within the CAP superfamily results in fundamentally similar functions for the CAP domain in all members, yet the diversity outside of this core region dramatically alters the target specificity and, thus, the biological consequences. The calcium-chelating function would fit with the various signalling processes (e.g. the CRISP proteins) that members of this family are involved in, and also the sequence and structural evidence of a conserved pocket containing two histidines and a glutamate.

Many of these proteins contain a C-terminal Cysteine-rich secretory protein (Crisp) domain. This domain is found in the mammalian reproductive tract and the venom of reptiles, and has been shown to regulate ryanodine receptor calcium signalling. It contains 10 conserved cysteines which are all involved in disulphide bonds and is structurally related to the ion channel inhibitor toxins BgK and ShK.
