= COCH =

Coch or COCH may refer to:

- Cochlin, extracellular matrix protein enriched in the inner ear
- Council of Christian Hospitals, in Andhra Pradesh, India
- Countess of Chester Hospital, in Chester, United Kingdom
- Aleix Coch (born 1991), Spanish footballer
- Jessica Coch (born 1979), Mexican actress
