= Neural cell adhesion molecule 1 =

Protein found in Homo sapiens

NCAM1
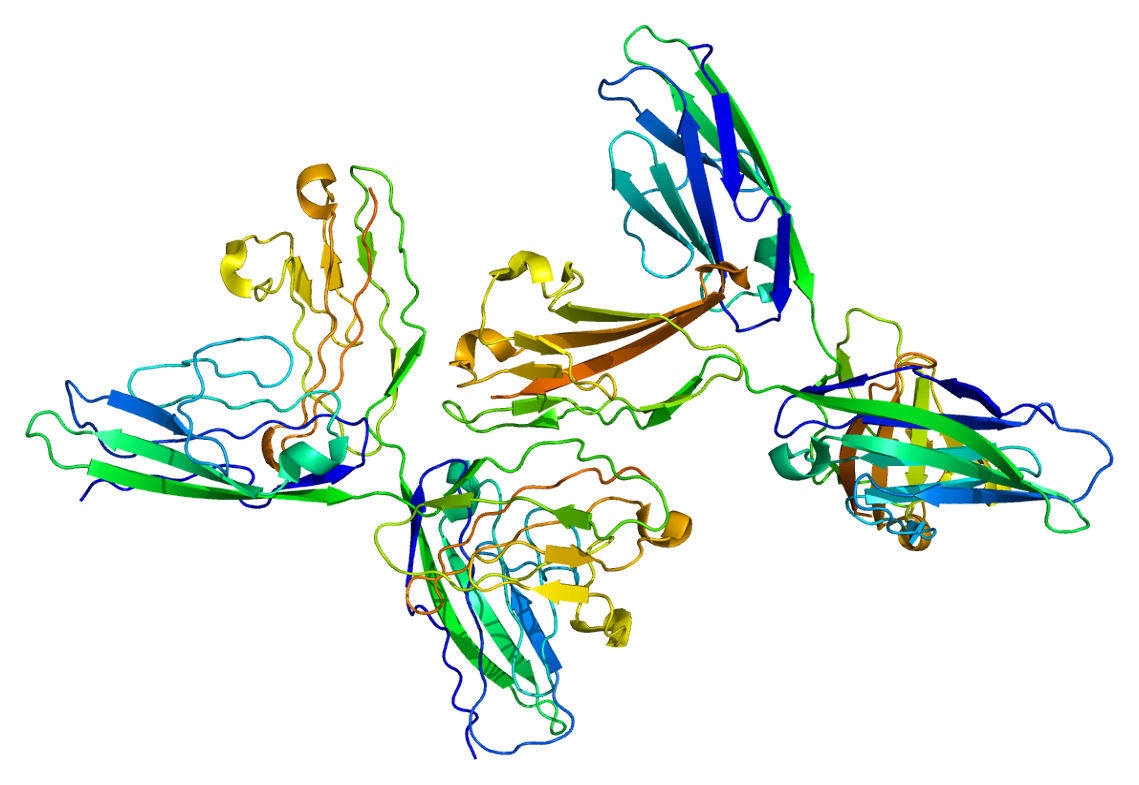

Identifiers
- Aliases: NCAM1, CD56, MSK39, NCAM, neural cell adhesion molecule 1
- External IDs: OMIM: 116930; MGI: 97281; GeneCards: NCAM1
Available structures
PDB	Ortholog search: PDBe RCSB
PDB	List of PDB id codes 2E3V, 2HAZ, 2VKW, 2VKX, 3MTR, 5AEA

Gene location (Human)
Chr.	Chromosome 11 (human)
Band	11q23.2	Start	112,961,247 bp
Band	11q23.2	End	113,278,436 bp

Gene location (Mouse)
Chr.	Chromosome 9 (mouse)
Band	9 A5.3|9 26.83 cM	Start	49,413,436 bp
Band	9 A5.3|9 26.83 cM	End	49,710,225 bp
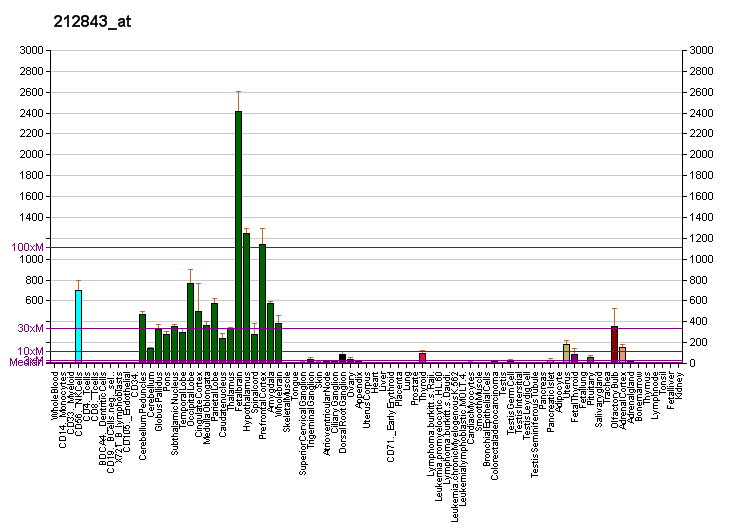

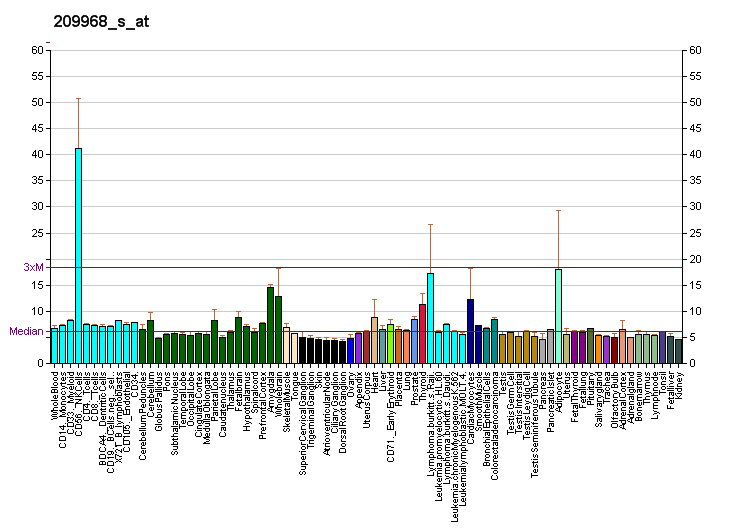
RNA expression pattern
Bgee	Human / Mouse (ortholog); Top expressed in: ventricular zone; ganglionic eminence; middle temporal gyrus; entorhinal cortex; corpus callosum; endothelial cell; Brodmann area 46; pons; superior frontal gyrus; prefrontal cortex / Top expressed in: Rostral migratory stream; barrel cortex; epithelium of lens; substantia nigra; neural layer of retina; ventromedial nucleus; iris; fossa; lateral hypothalamus; ascending aorta; More reference expression data
BioGPS	More reference expression data
Orthologs
Databases	NCBI: entry; OMA: entry
Species	Human	Mouse
Entrez	4684	17967
Ensembl	ENSG00000149294	ENSMUSG00000039542
UniProt	P13591	P13595
RefSeq (mRNA)	NM_181351; NM_000615; NM_001076682; NM_001242607; NM_001242608 NM_001386289; NM_001386290; NM_001386291; NM_001386292	NM_001081445; NM_001113204; NM_010875; NM_001311065
RefSeq (protein)	NP_000606; NP_001070150; NP_001229536; NP_001229537; NP_851996	NP_001074914; NP_001106675; NP_001297994; NP_035005; NP_001391651
Location (UCSC)	Chr 11: 112.96 – 113.28 Mb	Chr 9: 49.41 – 49.71 Mb
PubMed search
- Wikidata
View/Edit Human	View/Edit Mouse

Neural cell adhesion molecule 1 (NCAM1), also called NCAM or CD56, is a protein that in humans is encoded by the NCAM1 gene (previously NCAM). It is a homophilic binding glycoprotein expressed on the surface of neurons, glia and skeletal muscle. Although CD56 is often considered a marker of neural lineage commitment due to its discovery site, CD56 expression is also found in, among others, the hematopoietic system. Here, the expression of CD56 is mostly associated with, but not limited to, natural killer cells. CD56 has been detected on other lymphoid cells, including gamma delta (γδ) Τ cells and activated CD8+ T cells, as well as on dendritic cells. NCAM1 has been implicated as having a role in cell–cell adhesion, neurite outgrowth, synaptic plasticity, and learning and memory.

== Forms, domains and homophilic binding ==
NCAM1 is a glycoprotein of the Immunoglobulin (Ig) superfamily. At least 27 alternatively spliced NCAM1 mRNAs are produced, giving a wide diversity of NCAM1 isoforms. The three main isoforms of NCAM1 vary only in their cytoplasmic domain:

- NCAM-120kDa (GPI anchored)
- NCAM-140kDa (short cytoplasmic domain)
- NCAM-180kDa (long cytoplasmic domain)

The extracellular domain of NCAM1 consists of five immunoglobulin-like (Ig) domains followed by two fibronectin type III (FNIII) domains. The different domains of NCAM1 have been shown to have different roles, with the Ig domains being involved in homophilic binding to NCAM1, and the FNIII domains being involved signalling leading to neurite outgrowth.

Homophilic binding occurs between NCAM1 molecules on opposing surfaces (trans-) and NCAM1 molecules on the same surface (cis-)1. There is much controversy as to how exactly NCAM1 homophilic binding is arranged both in trans- and cis-. Current models suggest trans- homophilic binding occurs between two NCAM1 molecules binding antiparallel between all five Ig domains or just IgI and IgII. cis- homophilic binding is thought to occur by interactions between both IgI and IgII, and IgI and IgIII, forming a higher order NCAM1 multimer. Both cis- and trans- NCAM1 homophilic binding have been shown to be important in NCAM1 "activation" leading to neurite outgrowth.

== Minor exons ==
Another layer of complexity is created by the insertion of other "minor" exons in the NCAM1 transcript. The two most notable are:

- the VASE (VAriable domain Spliced Exon) exon which is thought to correlate with an inhibition of the neurite outgrowth promoting properties of NCAM1.
- the MSD (Muscle Specific Domain), which is thought to play a positive role in myoblast fusion. In skeletal muscle it is found in all three NCAM1 isoforms, increasing their MW, giving NCAM-125, NCAM-145, and NCAM-185 isoforms, but is most commonly found in the NCAM-125 isoform.

== Posttranslational modification ==
NCAM1 exhibits glycoforms as it can be posttranslationally modified by the addition of polysialic acid (PSA) to the fifth Ig domain, which is thought to abrogate its homophilic binding properties and can lead to reduced cell adhesion important in cell migration and invasion. PSA has been shown to be critical in learning and memory. Removal of PSA from NCAM1 by the enzyme endoneuraminidase (EndoN) has been shown to abolish long-term potentiation (LTP) and long-term depression (LTD).

== Expression in normal cells ==
The neural cell adhesion molecule NCAM1 appears on early embryonic cells and is important in the formation of cell collectives and their boundaries at sites of morphogenesis.

Later in development, NCAM1 (CD56) expression is found on various differentiated tissues and is a major CAM mediating adhesion among neurons and between neurons and muscle.

== Function ==
NCAM1 is thought to signal to induce neurite outgrowth via the fibroblast growth factor receptor (FGFR) and act upon the p59Fyn signaling pathway.

In nerves, NCAM1 regulates homophilic (like-like) interactions between neurons and between neurons and muscle; it associates with fibroblast growth factor receptor (FGFR) and stimulates tyrosine kinase activity of receptor to induce neurite outgrowth. When neural crest cells stop making N-CAM and N-cadherin, and start displaying integrin receptors, cells separate and migrate.

During hematopoiesis, CD56 is the prototypic marker of NK cells, also present on subset of CD4+ T cells and CD8+ T cells.

In cell adhesion, CD56 contributes to cell-cell adhesion or cell-matrix adhesion during embryonic development.

== Pathology ==
In anatomic pathology, pathologists make use of CD56 immunohistochemistry to recognize certain tumors.

- Normal cells that stain positively for CD56 include NK cells, activated T cells, the brain and cerebellum, and neuroendocrine tissues.
- Tumors that are CD56-positive are myeloma, myeloid leukemia, neuroendocrine tumors, Wilms' tumor, neuroblastoma, extranodal NK/T-cell lymphoma, nasal type, pancreatic acinar cell carcinoma, pheochromocytoma, paraganglioma, small cell lung carcinoma, and the Ewing's sarcoma family of tumors.

=== Viruses ===
NCAM1 has been identified as one of the target proteins for both the rabies and zika virus, allowing entry into the cell.

== Anti-NCAM1 therapy ==
NCAM1 has been used as a target molecule for experimental antibody-based immunotherapy. Successful radio-immunolocalisation of metastases was demonstrated after giving injections of NCAM1-binding 123J-UJ13a or 131J-UJ13a radio-immunoconjugates to children with neuroblastoma. Patients with small cell lung cancer were treated with the anti-NCAM1 immunotoxin huN901-DM1 in two different clinical studies, revealing acceptable toxicity and signs of clinical response.

== See also ==
- Neural cell adhesion molecule 2
