= LCCL domain =

LCCL
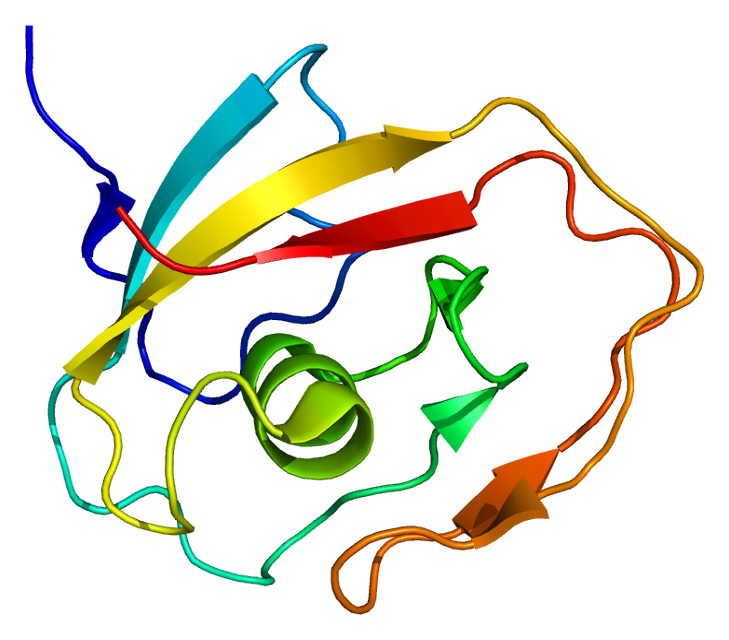
- LCCL domain in human Cochlin (PDB: 1jbi)

Identifiers
- Symbol: LCCL
- Pfam: PF03815
- Pfam clan: CL0513
- InterPro: IPR004043
- CATH: 1jbi
- SCOP2: 1jbi / SCOPe / SUPFAM
Available protein structures:
- Pfam: structures / ECOD
- PDB: RCSB PDB; PDBe; PDBj
- PDBsum: structure summary

In molecular biology, the LCCL domain is a protein domain which has been named after several well-characterised proteins that were found to contain it, namely Limulus clotting factor C, Cochlin (Coch-5b2) and Lgl1 (CRISPLD2). It is an about 100 amino acids domain whose C-terminal part contains a highly conserved histidine in a conserved motif YxxxSxxCxAAVHxGVI. The LCCL module is thought to be an autonomously folding domain that has been used for the construction of various modular proteins through exon-shuffling. It has been found in various metazoan proteins in association with complement B-type domains, C-type lectin domains, von Willebrand type A domains, CUB domains, discoidin lectin domains or CAP domains. It has been proposed that the LCCL domain could be involved in lipopolysaccharide (LPS) binding. LCCL exhibits a novel fold.

Some proteins known to contain a LCCL domain include Limulus factor C, an LPS endotoxin-sensitive trypsin type serine protease which serves to protect the organism from bacterial infection; vertebrate cochlear protein cochlin or coch-5b2 (Cochlin is probably a secreted protein, mutations affecting the LCCL domain of coch-5b2 cause the deafness disorder DFNA9 in humans); and mammalian late gestation lung protein Lgl1, contains two tandem copies of the LCCL domain.
