= CDON =

Protein-coding gene in humans

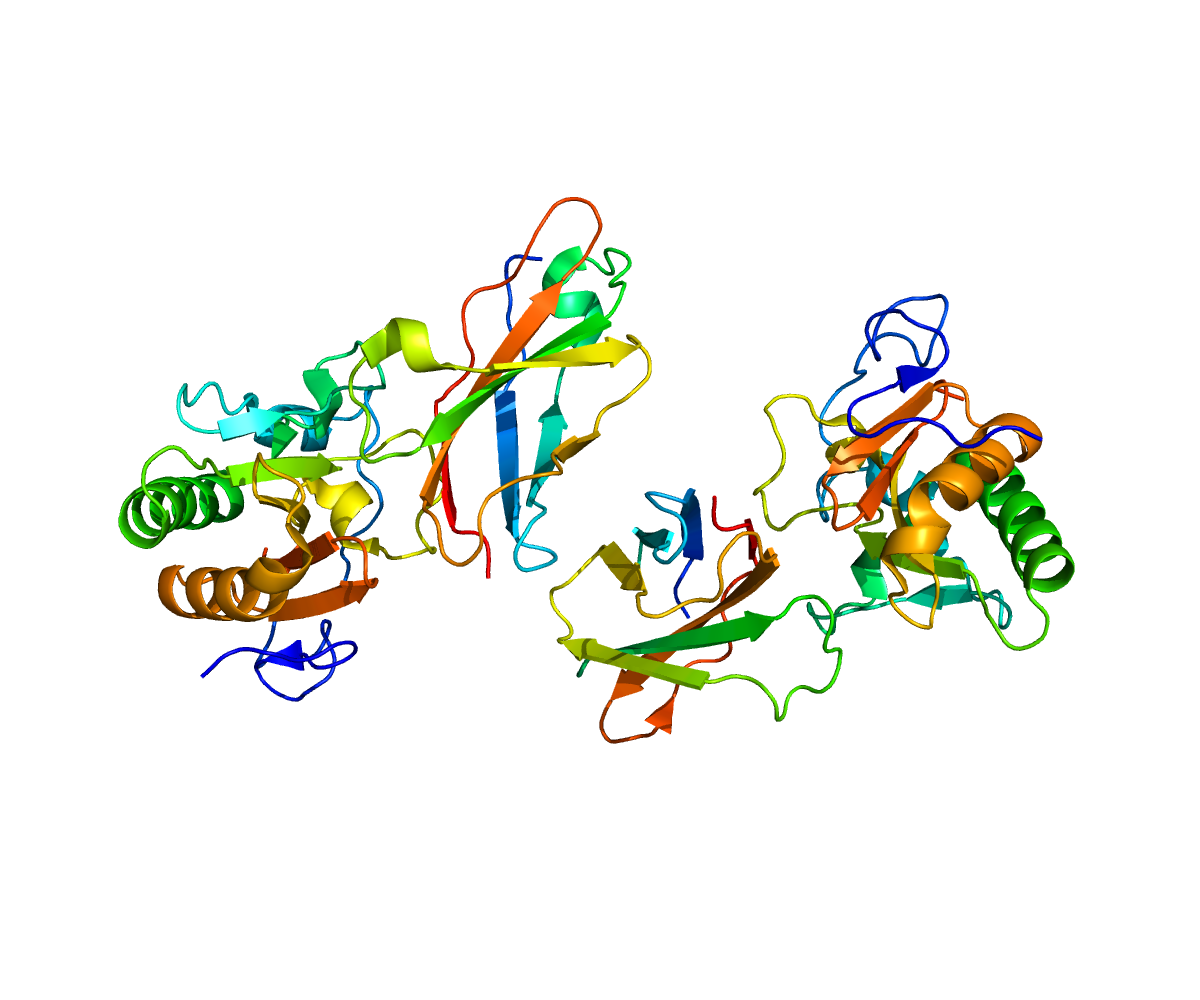

Identifiers
- Aliases: CDON, CDO, CDON1, HPE11, ORCAM, cell adhesion associated, oncogene regulated, Ihog
- External IDs: OMIM: 608707; MGI: 1926387; GeneCards: CDON
Available structures
PDB	Ortholog search: PDBe RCSB
PDB	List of PDB id codes 3D1M, 3N1F, 3N1Q

Gene location (Human)
Chr.	Chromosome 11 (human)
Band	11q24.2	Start	125,955,796 bp
Band	11q24.2	End	126,063,335 bp

Gene location (Mouse)
Chr.	Chromosome 9 (mouse)
Band	9|9 A4	Start	35,421,128 bp
Band	9|9 A4	End	35,507,652 bp
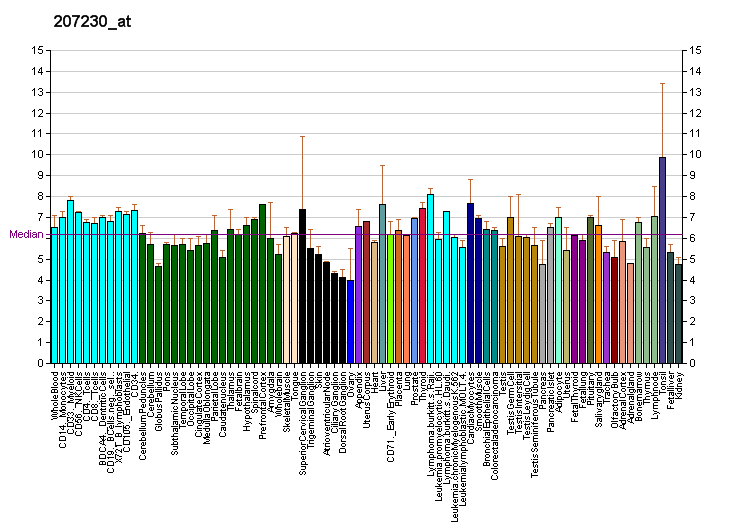
RNA expression pattern
Bgee	Human / Mouse (ortholog); Top expressed in: ventricular zone; ganglionic eminence; Achilles tendon; germinal epithelium; synovial joint; parietal pleura; left uterine tube; skin of hip; right ovary; left ovary / Top expressed in: vestibular membrane of cochlear duct; ventricular zone; vestibular sensory epithelium; ciliary body; vas deferens; utricle; efferent ductule; iris; foot; ankle; More reference expression data
BioGPS	More reference expression data
Gene ontology
Molecular function	protein binding
Cellular component	integral component of membrane; membrane; extracellular matrix; plasma membrane; integral component of plasma membrane; collagen-containing extracellular matrix
Biological process	regulation of neuron differentiation; positive regulation of small GTPase mediated signal transduction; positive regulation of protein phosphorylation; regulation of protein heterodimerization activity; positive regulation of skeletal muscle tissue development; positive regulation of muscle cell differentiation; embryonic body morphogenesis; cell fate specification; skeletal muscle satellite cell differentiation; positive regulation of neural precursor cell proliferation; lens development in camera-type eye; positive regulation of myoblast differentiation; embryonic morphogenesis; positive regulation of neuron differentiation; cerebral cortex development; embryonic retina morphogenesis in camera-type eye; smoothened signaling pathway; striated muscle cell differentiation; myoblast fusion; anterior/posterior pattern specification; positive regulation of MAPK cascade; positive regulation of transcription by RNA polymerase II; cell adhesion
Sources:Amigo / QuickGO
Orthologs
Databases	NCBI: entry; OMA: entry
Species	Human	Mouse
Entrez	50937	57810
Ensembl	ENSG00000064309	ENSMUSG00000038119
UniProt	Q4KMG0	Q32MD9
RefSeq (mRNA)	NM_001243597; NM_016952; NM_001378964	NM_021339
RefSeq (protein)	NP_001230526; NP_058648; NP_001365893	NP_067314; NP_001392175; NP_001392176; NP_001392177; NP_001392178 NP_001392179; NP_001392180
Location (UCSC)	Chr 11: 125.96 – 126.06 Mb	Chr 9: 35.42 – 35.51 Mb
PubMed search
- Wikidata
View/Edit Human	View/Edit Mouse

Cell adhesion molecule-related/down-regulated by oncogenes is a protein that in humans is encoded by the CDON gene.

CDON and BOC are cell surface receptors of the immunoglobulin (Ig)/fibronectin type III (FNIII) repeat family involved in myogenic differentiation. CDON and BOC are coexpressed during development, form complexes with each other in a cis fashion, and are related to each other in their ectodomains, but each has a unique long cytoplasmic tail.

== Structure and function ==
Cell adhesion molecule-related/down-regulated by oncogenes (CDON) is a conserved transmembrane glycoprotein belonging to a subgroup of the immunoglobulin superfamily of cell adhesion molecules. It is highly expressed in both the somites and dorsal lips of the neural tube of embryonic day 8.5 mice. It is expressed in proliferating and differentiating myoblast cell lines, there is evidence showing its role in mediating the effects of cell–cell interactions between muscle precursors that are critical in myogenesis. It is also expressed in neural crest precursor cells, it regulates the localization of N-cadherin providing a mechanism for directed neural crest migration. CDON protein was shown to bind to all three mammalian isoforms of hedgehog proteins: Sonic Hh, Indian Hh, and Desert Hh.

== Clinical significance ==
CDON mutations are thought to diminish sonic hedgehog (SHH)-pathway activity which is important in stimulating cell proliferation, differentiation, and tissue patterning at multiple points in animal development. CDON was shown to play a role in differentiation of midbrain dopaminergic neurons through the interference with of Shh signaling pathway. Mutations in CDON gene has been associated with Holoprosencephaly which is structural anomaly of the brain, in which the developing forebrain fails to correctly separate into right and left hemispheres. CDON mutations synergistically interact with prenatal alcohol exposure to increase susceptibility to Holoprosencephaly.

== Gene knockdown studies ==
CDON knockdown using morpholinos in zebra fish altered the eye development, CDON was shown important in restraining the size of the optic stalk and ventral retina in chick embryos. Additionally, double CDON knock out mice display optic nerve hypoplasia (ONH), a prominent feature of septo-optic dysplasia (SOD), the same phenotype shown by treating mice prenatally with ethanol. CDON^{−/−} animals also show cardiac dysfunction with increased fibrosis, those cardiac effects are mediated through hyperactivation of WNT/β-catenin signaling.

== Interactions ==
CDON has been shown to interact with CDH1 and BOC.
