= Neural cell adhesion molecule 2 =

Protein-coding gene found in humans

NCAM2

Identifiers
- Aliases: NCAM2, NCAM21, neural cell adhesion molecule 2
- External IDs: OMIM: 602040; MGI: 97282; GeneCards: NCAM2
Available structures
PDB	Ortholog search: PDBe RCSB
PDB	List of PDB id codes 2DOC, 2JLL, 2KBG, 2V5T, 2VAJ, 2WIM, 2XY1, 2XY2, 2XYC

Gene location (Human)
Chr.	Chromosome 21 (human)
Band	21q21.1	Start	20,998,409 bp
Band	21q21.1	End	21,543,329 bp

Gene location (Mouse)
Chr.	Chromosome 16 (mouse)
Band	16 C3.3|16 45.89 cM	Start	80,997,585 bp
Band	16 C3.3|16 45.89 cM	End	81,423,716 bp
RNA expression pattern
Bgee	Human / Mouse (ortholog); Top expressed in: ventricular zone; sural nerve; prefrontal cortex; stromal cell of endometrium; gonad; Brodmann area 9; cingulate gyrus; testicle; ganglionic eminence; anterior cingulate cortex / Top expressed in: subiculum; anterior amygdaloid area; ventromedial nucleus; ventral tegmental area; paraventricular nucleus of hypothalamus; olfactory tubercle; medial vestibular nucleus; mammillary body; habenula; substantia nigra; More reference expression data
BioGPS	n/a
Gene ontology
Molecular function	identical protein binding
Cellular component	integral component of membrane; axon; membrane; plasma membrane; nuclear body
Biological process	neuron cell-cell adhesion; cell adhesion; axonal fasciculation; sensory perception of smell
Sources:Amigo / QuickGO
Orthologs
Databases	NCBI: entry; OMA: entry
Species	Human	Mouse
Entrez	4685	17968
Ensembl	ENSG00000154654	ENSMUSG00000022762
UniProt	O15394	O35136
RefSeq (mRNA)	NM_004540; NM_001352591; NM_001352592; NM_001352593; NM_001352594 NM_001352595; NM_001352596; NM_001352597	NM_001113208; NM_010954
RefSeq (protein)	NP_004531; NP_001339520; NP_001339521; NP_001339522; NP_001339523 NP_001339524; NP_001339525; NP_001339526	NP_001106679; NP_035084
Location (UCSC)	Chr 21: 21 – 21.54 Mb	Chr 16: 81 – 81.42 Mb
PubMed search
- Wikidata
View/Edit Human	View/Edit Mouse

Neural cell adhesion molecule 2 is a protein that in humans is encoded by the NCAM2 gene. This protein is involved in nervous system development, and the projection of neuron axons, especially in the case of olfactory axons (involved in smell).

== Medical Significance ==
=== Cancer ===
The NCAM2 gene has been observed progressively downregulated in human papillomavirus-positive neoplastic keratinocytes derived from uterine cervical preneoplastic lesions at different levels of malignancy. The source suggests that NCAM2 is likely to be associated with tumorigenesis and may be a potential prognostic marker for uterine cervical preneoplastic lesions progression.

=== Alzheimer's disease ===
NCAM2 is found in lower levels in hippocampal synapses of Alzheimer's disease sufferers and is found to be broken down by beta-amyloid.

== See also ==
- Neural cell adhesion molecule 1
