= Endo-alpha-sialidase =

Endo-α-sialidase

Identifiers
- EC no.: 3.2.1.129
- CAS no.: 91195-87-8

Databases
- BRENDA: enzyme data
- ExPASy: NiceZyme view
- KEGG: enzyme entry
- MetaCyc: metabolic pathway
- Rhea: reactions
- PDB structures: RCSB PDB PDBe PDBsum
Search
- PMC: articles
- PubMed: articles
- NCBI: proteins

Endo-α-sialidase (EC 3.2.1.129, endo-N-acylneuraminidase, endoneuraminidase, endo-N-acetylneuraminidase, poly(α-2,8-sialosyl) endo-N-acetylneuraminidase, poly(α-2,8-sialoside) α-2,8-sialosylhydrolase, endosialidase, endo-N) is an enzyme with systematic name polysialoside (2→8)-α-sialosylhydrolase. It catalyses the following chemical reaction:

Endohydrolysis of (2→8)-α-sialosyl linkages in oligo- or poly(sialic) acids
