= Cochlin =

Protein highly abundant in the cochlea and vestibule of the inner ear

COCH
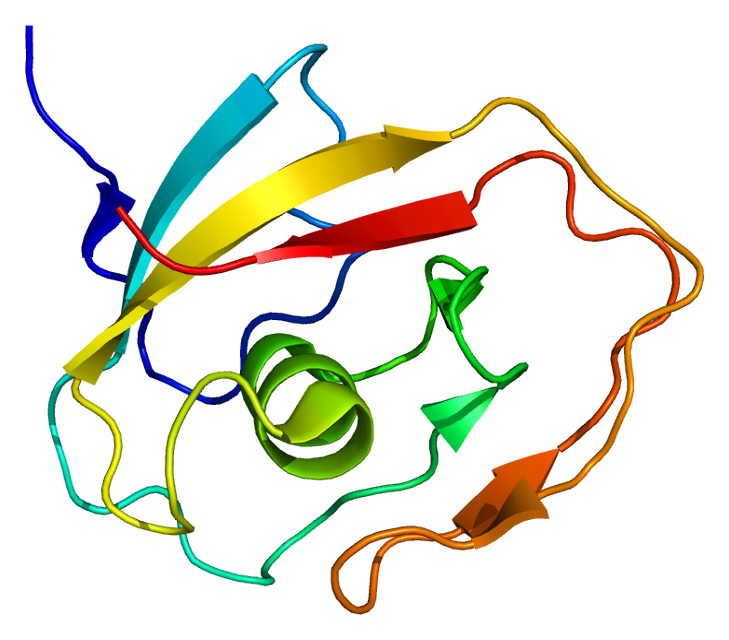

Identifiers
- Aliases: COCH, COCH-5B2, COCH5B2, DFNA9, cochlin, DFNB110
- External IDs: OMIM: 603196; MGI: 1278313; GeneCards: COCH
Available structures
PDB	Ortholog search: PDBe RCSB
PDB	List of PDB id codes 1JBI

Gene location (Human)
Chr.	Chromosome 14 (human)
Band	14q12	Start	30,874,514 bp
Band	14q12	End	30,895,065 bp

Gene location (Mouse)
Chr.	Chromosome 12 (mouse)
Band	12 B3|12 22.11 cM	Start	51,640,124 bp
Band	12 B3|12 22.11 cM	End	51,652,554 bp
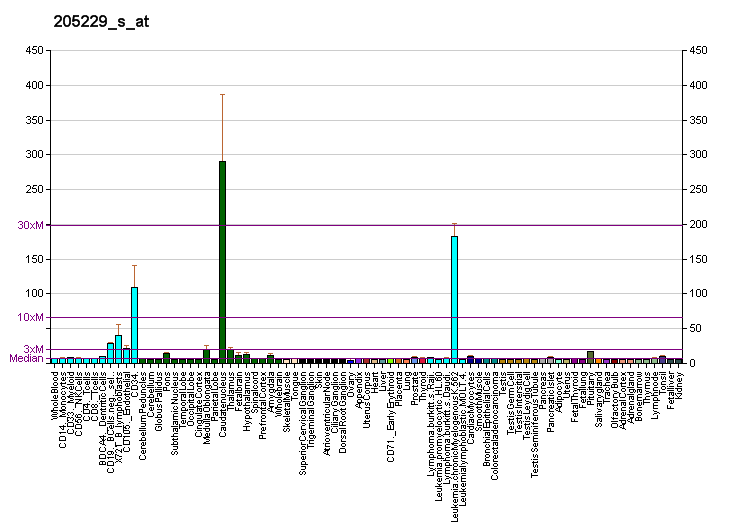
RNA expression pattern
Bgee	Human / Mouse (ortholog); Top expressed in: buccal mucosa cell; saphenous vein; Skeletal muscle tissue of biceps brachii; vena cava; Skeletal muscle tissue of rectus abdominis; pericardium; tail of epididymis; body of tongue; superior surface of tongue; right ventricle / Top expressed in: utricle; vestibular membrane of cochlear duct; vestibular sensory epithelium; spleen; olfactory epithelium; lip; gastrula; decidua; skin of external ear; stria vascularis; More reference expression data
BioGPS	More reference expression data
Gene ontology
Molecular function	protein binding; collagen binding
Cellular component	extracellular matrix; extracellular region; collagen-containing extracellular matrix; extracellular space
Biological process	hearing; defense response to bacterium; regulation of cell shape; positive regulation of innate immune response; growth plate cartilage chondrocyte morphogenesis
Sources:Amigo / QuickGO
Orthologs
Databases	NCBI: entry; OMA: entry
Species	Human	Mouse
Entrez	1690	12810
Ensembl	ENSG00000100473	ENSMUSG00000020953
UniProt	O43405	Q62507
RefSeq (mRNA)	NM_001135058; NM_004086; NM_001347720	NM_001198835; NM_007728
RefSeq (protein)	NP_001128530; NP_001334649; NP_004077	NP_001185764; NP_031754
Location (UCSC)	Chr 14: 30.87 – 30.9 Mb	Chr 12: 51.64 – 51.65 Mb
PubMed search
- Wikidata
View/Edit Human	View/Edit Mouse

Cochlin is a protein that in humans is encoded by the COCH gene. It is an extracellular matrix (ECM) protein highly abundant in the cochlea and vestibule of the inner ear, constituting the major non-collagen component of the ECM of the inner ear. The protein is highly conserved in human, mouse, and chicken, showing 94% and 79% amino acid identity of human to mouse and chicken sequences, respectively.

== Structure ==
Cochlin contains three protein domains: an N-terminal LCCL domain, and two copies of Von Willebrand factor type A domains.

== Function ==
The gene is expressed in spindle-shaped cells located along nerve fibers between the auditory ganglion and sensory epithelium. These cells accompany neurites at the habenula perforata, the opening through which neurites extend to innervate hair cells. This and the pattern of expression of this gene in chicken inner ear paralleled the histologic findings of acidophilic deposits, consistent with mucopolysaccharide ground substance, in temporal bones from DFNA9 (autosomal dominant nonsyndromic sensorineural deafness 9) patients. Mutations that cause DFNA9 have been reported in this gene.

Cochlin has been identified in the trabecular meshwork (TM) of glaucoma patients, but not in healthy controls. The TM is a filter like area of tissue in the eye; cochlin may have a role in cell adhesion, mechanosensation, and modulation of the TM filter.

It is also expressed in follicular dendritic cells in spleen and lymph nodes. Here, cochlin is cleaved by aggrecanases and secreted into blood circulation during inflammation, contributing to the antibacterial innate immune response.
