= Peptidase inhibitor 15 =

Protein-coding gene in the species Homo sapiens

PI15

Identifiers
- Aliases: PI15, CRISP8, P24TI, P25TI, peptidase inhibitor 15
- External IDs: OMIM: 607076; MGI: 1934659; HomoloGene: 22935; GeneCards: PI15; OMA:PI15 - orthologs

Gene location (Human)
| Chr. | Chromosome 8 (human) |
| Band | 8q21.13 | Start | 74,824,534 bp |
| Band | 8q21.13 | End | 74,855,029 bp |

Gene location (Mouse)
| Chr. | Chromosome 1 (mouse) |
| Band | 1|1 A3 | Start | 17,672,125 bp |
| Band | 1|1 A3 | End | 17,701,163 bp |
RNA expression pattern
| Bgee | Human / Mouse (ortholog); Top expressed in: tail of epididymis; lactiferous duct; appendix; left uterine tube; seminal vesicula; cartilage tissue; smooth muscle tissue; prostate; visceral pleura; urethra / Top expressed in: ascending aorta; aortic valve; glomerulus; uterus; decidua; tunica media of zone of aorta; Bowman's capsule; vas deferens; esophagus; endothelial cell of lymphatic vessel; More reference expression data |
| BioGPS | n/a |
Gene ontology
| Molecular function | peptidase inhibitor activity |
| Cellular component | extracellular exosome; extracellular region; extracellular space |
| Biological process | negative regulation of peptidase activity; multicellular organism development; biological process |
Sources:Amigo / QuickGO
Orthologs
| Species | Human | Mouse |
| Entrez | 51050 | 94227 |
| Ensembl | ENSG00000137558 | ENSMUSG00000067780 |
| UniProt | O43692 | Q8BS03 |
| RefSeq (mRNA) | NM_015886; NM_001324403 | NM_053191 |
| RefSeq (protein) | NP_001311332; NP_056970 | NP_444421 |
| Location (UCSC) | Chr 8: 74.82 – 74.86 Mb | Chr 1: 17.67 – 17.7 Mb |
| PubMed search |
- Wikidata
| View/Edit Human | View/Edit Mouse |

Peptidase inhibitor 15 is a protein that in humans is encoded by the PI15 gene.

== Function ==
This gene encodes a trypsin inhibitor. The protein shares similarity to insect venom allergens, mammalian testis-specific proteins and plant pathogenesis-related proteins. It is frequently expressed in human neuroblastoma and glioblastoma cell lines, and thus may play a role in the central nervous system. [provided by RefSeq, Jul 2008].
