= GLIPR1 =

Protein-coding gene in humans

Identifiers
- Aliases: GLIPR1, CRISP7, GLIPR, RTVP1, GLI pathogenesis related 1
- External IDs: OMIM: 602692; MGI: 1920940; GeneCards: GLIPR1
Available structures
PDB	Ortholog search: PDBe RCSB
PDB	List of PDB id codes 3Q2R, 3Q2U

Gene location (Human)
Chr.	Chromosome 12 (human)
Band	12q21.2	Start	75,480,753 bp
Band	12q21.2	End	75,503,863 bp

Gene location (Mouse)
Chr.	Chromosome 10 (mouse)
Band	10|10 D2	Start	111,821,353 bp
Band	10|10 D2	End	111,838,536 bp
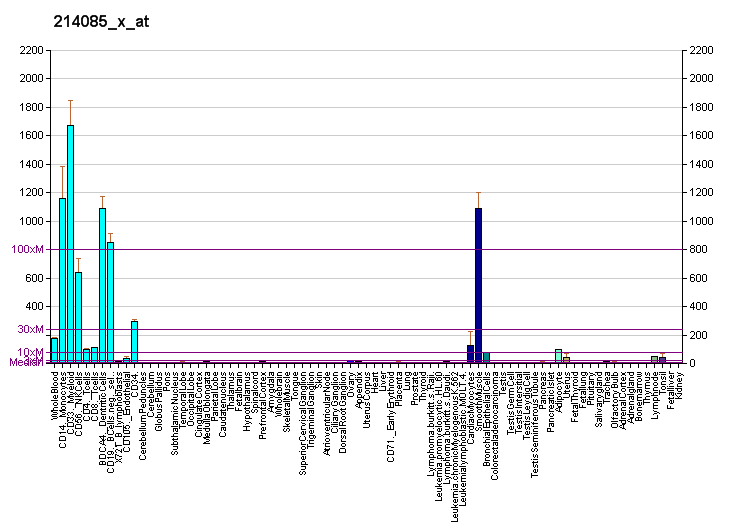

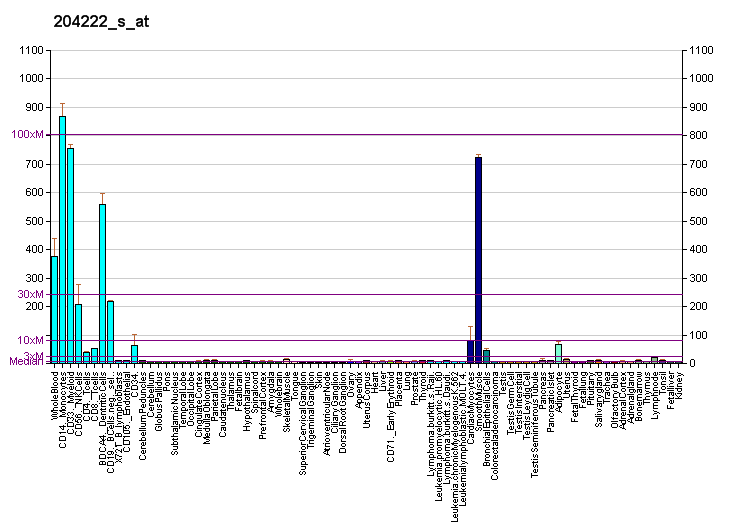

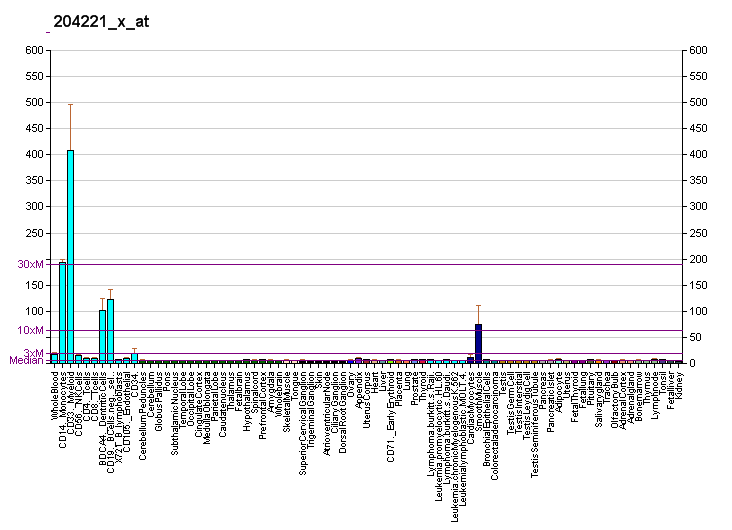
RNA expression pattern
Bgee	Human / Mouse (ortholog); Top expressed in: monocyte; secondary oocyte; stromal cell of endometrium; pericardium; thoracic aorta; ascending aorta; blood; Descending thoracic aorta; granulocyte; right coronary artery / Top expressed in: granulocyte; calvaria; stroma of bone marrow; gastrula; decidua; umbilical cord; mesenteric lymph nodes; spleen; tibiofemoral joint; thymus; More reference expression data
BioGPS	More reference expression data
Orthologs
Databases	NCBI: entry; OMA: entry
Species	Human	Mouse
Entrez	11010	73690
Ensembl	ENSG00000139278	ENSMUSG00000056888
UniProt	P48060	Q9CWG1
RefSeq (mRNA)	NM_006851	NM_028608
RefSeq (protein)	NP_006842	NP_082884
Location (UCSC)	Chr 12: 75.48 – 75.5 Mb	Chr 10: 111.82 – 111.84 Mb
PubMed search
- Wikidata
View/Edit Human	View/Edit Mouse

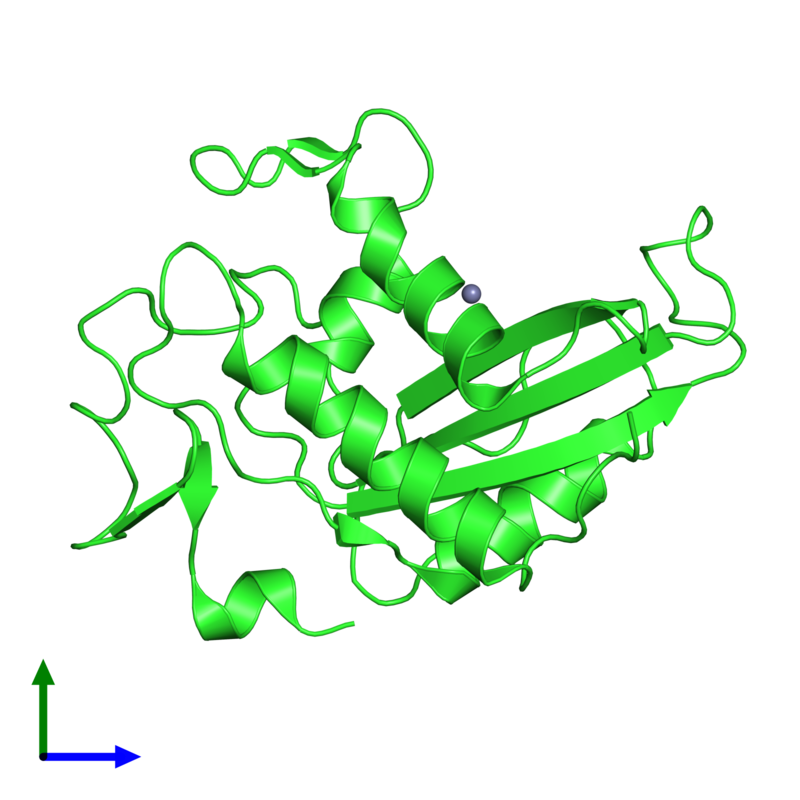
PDB 3q2r coloured by chain and viewed from the front.

Glioma pathogenesis-related protein 1 is a protein that in humans is encoded by the GLIPR1 gene.

== Function ==
This gene encodes a protein with similarity to both the pathogenesis-related protein (PR) superfamily and the cysteine-rich secretory protein (CRISP) family.

== Discovery ==
The previous finding of RTVP1 (GLIPR1) as a p53 target gene with tumor suppressor functions prompted the researches to initiate a genome-wide sequence homology search for RTVP1/GLIPR1-like (GLIPR1L) genes. p53, the tumor suppressor gene is the most commonly mutated gene in human cancer. Mutation in p53 gene can lead to cellular malfunctions such as malignant growth and metastasis. Human GLIPR1, was initially identified in human glioblastoma and was called as GLIPR1 (glioma pathogenesis-related protein 1) or RTVP1 (related to testes-specific, vespid, and pathogenesis protein 1). Furthermore, it was identified as a marker of myelomocytic differentiation in macrophage. RTVP-1 cluster proteins share significant sequence homology with the members of (PR ) superfamily and CRISP Family proteins.

== Structure ==
Protein structure: GLIPR1 is in two isomeric form, identifier: P48060-1 and P48060-2, which encodes 266(30,366 da) and 236( 26, 919 Da ) amino acid. The GLIPR1 proteins contains following domains:

• SCP: SCP-like extracellular protein domain •CAP: Cysteine-rich secretory protein family

These predicted transmembrane domains a makes them unique to mammalian CAP proteins and are not presented in any othert GLIPR1 isoforms. CAP domain is 15 KDa structurally conserved cystine rich domain as was historically referred to as SCP, NCBI cd00168 pr Pfam00188.

== Gene location ==
GLIPR1L and Glipr1l genes are located very near RTVP1 within the range of 170 kb, in human it is in chromosome 12q21 and in chromosome 10D1 in mouse (Figs. 1A and 1B). In human GLIPR1 gene is located on the long (q) arm of chromosome 12 from base pair 71500001-75700000 (Build GRCh37/hg19)(map)

== Gene expression ==
GlIPR1 is highly tissue specific with high mRNA, with the expression of GLIPR1L1 being with very high mRNA levels in testes but few traces in bladder followed by undetectable expression in prostate, kidney, lung, and bone marrow. The expression GLIPR1L2 was similar to GLIPR1L1.

== Clinical significance ==
Study showed human GLIPR1 promoter to be highly methylated in prostate cancer tissues compared to the normal prostate tissue correlating with the decreased level of GLIPR1 expression. Hence, GLIPR1 has been proposed to act as a tumor suppressor that undergoes epigenetic inactivation in prostate cancer. This unique property of GLIPR1 might be effective for the control of malignancies. Preclinical studies has the significant suppression of tumor growth when AdGLIPR1 was directly injected into prostate cancer using an immunocompetent orthotopic mouse model.

== Homology with plant defense mechanism ==
GLIPR1 exhibits 35% amino acid sequence identity with the tomato pathogenesis-related (PR) protein P14a, which has importance in plant defense mechanism. Comparison of these two protein lead to the identification of a common partially solvent-exposed spatial cluster of four amino acid residues, His-69, Glu-88, Glu-110, and His-127 in the GliPR numeration which indicates a common putative active site for GliPR and PR-1 proteins making a functional link between the human immune system and a plant defense system.

== Cancer types/SNP positions ==
The graphical representation of number of positions affected by cancer type vs cancer type and number of cancer types vs postiiton in amino acid sequence is provided in the link.

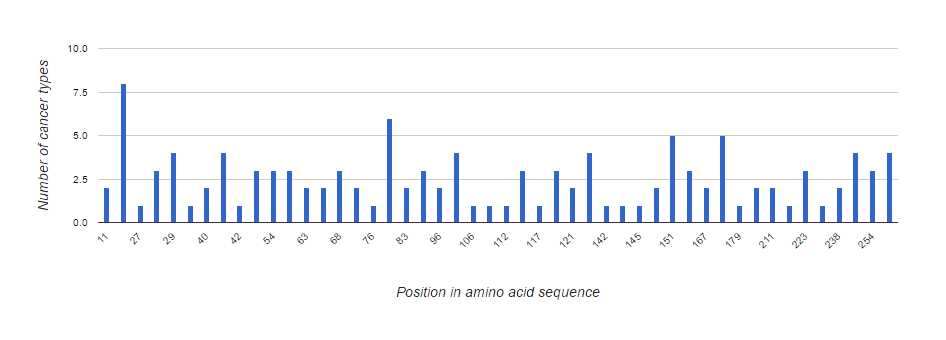
Number of cancer types vs position in amino acid sequence

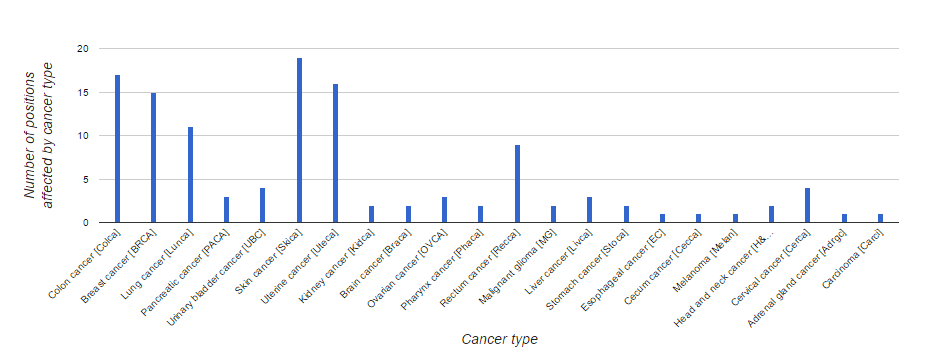
Number of position affected by cancer types vs cancer type
