= BOC (gene) =

Protein-coding gene in the species Homo sapiens

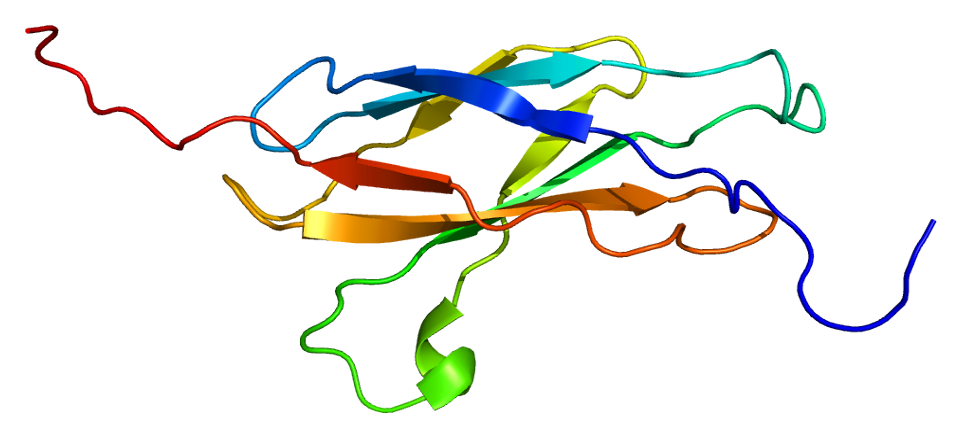

Identifiers
- Aliases: BOC, CDON2, BOC cell adhesion associated, oncogene regulated, Boi
- External IDs: OMIM: 608708; MGI: 2151153; GeneCards: BOC
Available structures
PDB	Ortholog search: PDBe RCSB
PDB	List of PDB id codes 3N1G, 3N1M, 3N1P

Gene location (Human)
Chr.	Chromosome 3 (human)
Band	3q13.2	Start	113,211,003 bp
Band	3q13.2	End	113,287,459 bp

Gene location (Mouse)
Chr.	Chromosome 16 (mouse)
Band	16|16 B4	Start	44,305,412 bp
Band	16|16 B4	End	44,379,260 bp
RNA expression pattern
Bgee	Human / Mouse (ortholog); Top expressed in: tendon of biceps brachii; ventricular zone; left uterine tube; skin of arm; gastric mucosa; parotid gland; skin of thigh; right uterine tube; body of uterus; tibia / Top expressed in: ventricular zone; skin of external ear; efferent ductule; internal carotid artery; vas deferens; lip; trachea; ascending aorta; conjunctival fornix; aortic valve; More reference expression data
BioGPS	n/a
Gene ontology
Molecular function	protein binding
Cellular component	integral component of membrane; plasma membrane; axonal growth cone; integral component of plasma membrane; membrane; nucleoplasm
Biological process	smoothened signaling pathway; cell adhesion; positive regulation of myoblast differentiation; positive regulation of muscle cell differentiation; axon guidance
Sources:Amigo / QuickGO
Orthologs
Databases	NCBI: entry; OMA: entry
Species	Human	Mouse
Entrez	91653	117606
Ensembl	ENSG00000144857	ENSMUSG00000022687
UniProt	Q9BWV1	Q6AZB0
RefSeq (mRNA)	NM_001301861; NM_001301867; NM_033254; NM_001378073; NM_001378074 NM_001378075; NM_001387919; NM_001387920; NM_001387921; NM_001387922; NM_001387923; NM_001387924; NM_001387925; NM_001387926; NM_001387927; NM_001387928; NM_001387929; NM_001387930; NM_001387932	NM_172506
RefSeq (protein)	NP_001288790; NP_001288796; NP_150279; NP_001365002; NP_001365003 NP_001365004	NP_766094
Location (UCSC)	Chr 3: 113.21 – 113.29 Mb	Chr 16: 44.31 – 44.38 Mb
PubMed search
- Wikidata
View/Edit Human	View/Edit Mouse

Brother of CDO is a protein that in humans is encoded by the BOC gene.

CDON (MIM 608707) and BOC are cell surface receptors of the immunoglobulin (Ig)/fibronectin type III (FNIII; see MIM 135600) repeat family involved in myogenic differentiation. CDON and BOC are coexpressed during development, form complexes with each other in a cis fashion, and are related to each other in their ectodomains, but each has a unique long cytoplasmic tail.[supplied by OMIM]

== Interactions ==
BOC (gene) has been shown to interact with CDON.
